

174001–174100 

|-bgcolor=#d6d6d6
| 174001 ||  || — || December 15, 2001 || Socorro || LINEAR || EOS || align=right | 3.1 km || 
|-id=002 bgcolor=#d6d6d6
| 174002 ||  || — || December 15, 2001 || Socorro || LINEAR || — || align=right | 4.0 km || 
|-id=003 bgcolor=#d6d6d6
| 174003 ||  || — || December 14, 2001 || Kitt Peak || Spacewatch || THM || align=right | 3.1 km || 
|-id=004 bgcolor=#d6d6d6
| 174004 ||  || — || December 11, 2001 || Socorro || LINEAR || — || align=right | 4.6 km || 
|-id=005 bgcolor=#d6d6d6
| 174005 ||  || — || December 13, 2001 || Palomar || NEAT || — || align=right | 2.8 km || 
|-id=006 bgcolor=#d6d6d6
| 174006 ||  || — || December 17, 2001 || Socorro || LINEAR || — || align=right | 5.8 km || 
|-id=007 bgcolor=#d6d6d6
| 174007 ||  || — || December 17, 2001 || Socorro || LINEAR || — || align=right | 6.2 km || 
|-id=008 bgcolor=#d6d6d6
| 174008 ||  || — || December 17, 2001 || Socorro || LINEAR || HYG || align=right | 3.8 km || 
|-id=009 bgcolor=#d6d6d6
| 174009 ||  || — || December 17, 2001 || Socorro || LINEAR || — || align=right | 6.6 km || 
|-id=010 bgcolor=#E9E9E9
| 174010 ||  || — || December 17, 2001 || Socorro || LINEAR || AGN || align=right | 2.7 km || 
|-id=011 bgcolor=#d6d6d6
| 174011 ||  || — || December 17, 2001 || Socorro || LINEAR || — || align=right | 5.3 km || 
|-id=012 bgcolor=#d6d6d6
| 174012 ||  || — || December 18, 2001 || Socorro || LINEAR || THM || align=right | 3.5 km || 
|-id=013 bgcolor=#d6d6d6
| 174013 ||  || — || December 18, 2001 || Socorro || LINEAR || HYG || align=right | 3.9 km || 
|-id=014 bgcolor=#d6d6d6
| 174014 ||  || — || December 18, 2001 || Socorro || LINEAR || — || align=right | 3.7 km || 
|-id=015 bgcolor=#d6d6d6
| 174015 ||  || — || December 18, 2001 || Socorro || LINEAR || HYG || align=right | 3.3 km || 
|-id=016 bgcolor=#d6d6d6
| 174016 ||  || — || December 18, 2001 || Socorro || LINEAR || — || align=right | 6.4 km || 
|-id=017 bgcolor=#d6d6d6
| 174017 ||  || — || December 18, 2001 || Kitt Peak || Spacewatch || — || align=right | 3.5 km || 
|-id=018 bgcolor=#d6d6d6
| 174018 ||  || — || December 17, 2001 || Socorro || LINEAR || TIR || align=right | 4.7 km || 
|-id=019 bgcolor=#d6d6d6
| 174019 ||  || — || December 18, 2001 || Socorro || LINEAR || — || align=right | 6.5 km || 
|-id=020 bgcolor=#d6d6d6
| 174020 ||  || — || December 17, 2001 || Socorro || LINEAR || EUP || align=right | 7.9 km || 
|-id=021 bgcolor=#d6d6d6
| 174021 ||  || — || December 17, 2001 || Socorro || LINEAR || LIX || align=right | 6.8 km || 
|-id=022 bgcolor=#d6d6d6
| 174022 ||  || — || December 17, 2001 || Socorro || LINEAR || — || align=right | 3.4 km || 
|-id=023 bgcolor=#d6d6d6
| 174023 ||  || — || December 20, 2001 || Socorro || LINEAR || — || align=right | 5.7 km || 
|-id=024 bgcolor=#d6d6d6
| 174024 ||  || — || December 17, 2001 || Socorro || LINEAR || MEL || align=right | 5.4 km || 
|-id=025 bgcolor=#d6d6d6
| 174025 ||  || — || December 22, 2001 || Socorro || LINEAR || — || align=right | 4.7 km || 
|-id=026 bgcolor=#d6d6d6
| 174026 ||  || — || December 17, 2001 || Socorro || LINEAR || — || align=right | 3.4 km || 
|-id=027 bgcolor=#d6d6d6
| 174027 ||  || — || December 18, 2001 || Anderson Mesa || LONEOS || — || align=right | 4.7 km || 
|-id=028 bgcolor=#d6d6d6
| 174028 ||  || — || December 19, 2001 || Socorro || LINEAR || LIX || align=right | 5.9 km || 
|-id=029 bgcolor=#d6d6d6
| 174029 ||  || — || December 19, 2001 || Palomar || NEAT || — || align=right | 6.9 km || 
|-id=030 bgcolor=#d6d6d6
| 174030 ||  || — || December 19, 2001 || Palomar || NEAT || — || align=right | 4.5 km || 
|-id=031 bgcolor=#d6d6d6
| 174031 ||  || — || January 7, 2002 || Anderson Mesa || LONEOS || — || align=right | 6.6 km || 
|-id=032 bgcolor=#d6d6d6
| 174032 ||  || — || January 9, 2002 || Socorro || LINEAR || — || align=right | 4.0 km || 
|-id=033 bgcolor=#d6d6d6
| 174033 ||  || — || January 9, 2002 || Socorro || LINEAR || — || align=right | 4.2 km || 
|-id=034 bgcolor=#d6d6d6
| 174034 ||  || — || January 9, 2002 || Socorro || LINEAR || — || align=right | 4.9 km || 
|-id=035 bgcolor=#d6d6d6
| 174035 ||  || — || January 9, 2002 || Socorro || LINEAR || EOS || align=right | 3.9 km || 
|-id=036 bgcolor=#d6d6d6
| 174036 ||  || — || January 9, 2002 || Socorro || LINEAR || — || align=right | 5.7 km || 
|-id=037 bgcolor=#d6d6d6
| 174037 ||  || — || January 9, 2002 || Socorro || LINEAR || — || align=right | 7.9 km || 
|-id=038 bgcolor=#d6d6d6
| 174038 ||  || — || January 9, 2002 || Socorro || LINEAR || — || align=right | 9.3 km || 
|-id=039 bgcolor=#d6d6d6
| 174039 ||  || — || January 9, 2002 || Socorro || LINEAR || — || align=right | 6.5 km || 
|-id=040 bgcolor=#d6d6d6
| 174040 ||  || — || January 8, 2002 || Socorro || LINEAR || VER || align=right | 4.5 km || 
|-id=041 bgcolor=#d6d6d6
| 174041 ||  || — || January 9, 2002 || Socorro || LINEAR || — || align=right | 8.0 km || 
|-id=042 bgcolor=#d6d6d6
| 174042 ||  || — || January 9, 2002 || Socorro || LINEAR || — || align=right | 6.5 km || 
|-id=043 bgcolor=#d6d6d6
| 174043 ||  || — || January 14, 2002 || Socorro || LINEAR || — || align=right | 4.3 km || 
|-id=044 bgcolor=#d6d6d6
| 174044 ||  || — || January 14, 2002 || Socorro || LINEAR || SYL7:4 || align=right | 6.8 km || 
|-id=045 bgcolor=#d6d6d6
| 174045 ||  || — || January 5, 2002 || Anderson Mesa || LONEOS || HYG || align=right | 4.9 km || 
|-id=046 bgcolor=#d6d6d6
| 174046 ||  || — || January 18, 2002 || Socorro || LINEAR || — || align=right | 5.9 km || 
|-id=047 bgcolor=#d6d6d6
| 174047 ||  || — || January 18, 2002 || Socorro || LINEAR || 7:4 || align=right | 6.7 km || 
|-id=048 bgcolor=#d6d6d6
| 174048 ||  || — || January 21, 2002 || Socorro || LINEAR || — || align=right | 4.3 km || 
|-id=049 bgcolor=#d6d6d6
| 174049 ||  || — || January 23, 2002 || Socorro || LINEAR || — || align=right | 6.9 km || 
|-id=050 bgcolor=#FFC2E0
| 174050 ||  || — || February 10, 2002 || Anderson Mesa || LONEOS || AMO +1km || align=right | 1.1 km || 
|-id=051 bgcolor=#d6d6d6
| 174051 ||  || — || February 4, 2002 || Palomar || NEAT || VER || align=right | 4.3 km || 
|-id=052 bgcolor=#d6d6d6
| 174052 ||  || — || February 6, 2002 || Socorro || LINEAR || ALA || align=right | 5.3 km || 
|-id=053 bgcolor=#d6d6d6
| 174053 ||  || — || February 7, 2002 || Socorro || LINEAR || 7:4 || align=right | 8.7 km || 
|-id=054 bgcolor=#fefefe
| 174054 ||  || — || February 7, 2002 || Socorro || LINEAR || FLO || align=right | 1.1 km || 
|-id=055 bgcolor=#fefefe
| 174055 ||  || — || February 7, 2002 || Socorro || LINEAR || — || align=right | 1.2 km || 
|-id=056 bgcolor=#fefefe
| 174056 ||  || — || February 7, 2002 || Socorro || LINEAR || — || align=right | 1.4 km || 
|-id=057 bgcolor=#d6d6d6
| 174057 ||  || — || February 7, 2002 || Socorro || LINEAR || HYG || align=right | 4.7 km || 
|-id=058 bgcolor=#d6d6d6
| 174058 ||  || — || February 8, 2002 || Socorro || LINEAR || MEL || align=right | 5.9 km || 
|-id=059 bgcolor=#d6d6d6
| 174059 ||  || — || February 8, 2002 || Socorro || LINEAR || — || align=right | 7.8 km || 
|-id=060 bgcolor=#d6d6d6
| 174060 ||  || — || February 14, 2002 || Socorro || LINEAR || EUP || align=right | 5.6 km || 
|-id=061 bgcolor=#d6d6d6
| 174061 ||  || — || February 6, 2002 || Palomar || NEAT || URS || align=right | 3.9 km || 
|-id=062 bgcolor=#d6d6d6
| 174062 ||  || — || February 11, 2002 || Socorro || LINEAR || THM || align=right | 3.4 km || 
|-id=063 bgcolor=#d6d6d6
| 174063 ||  || — || February 7, 2002 || Socorro || LINEAR || — || align=right | 3.9 km || 
|-id=064 bgcolor=#d6d6d6
| 174064 ||  || — || February 16, 2002 || Palomar || NEAT || — || align=right | 4.5 km || 
|-id=065 bgcolor=#d6d6d6
| 174065 ||  || — || March 10, 2002 || Cima Ekar || ADAS || THM || align=right | 4.9 km || 
|-id=066 bgcolor=#fefefe
| 174066 ||  || — || March 11, 2002 || Palomar || NEAT || — || align=right | 1.4 km || 
|-id=067 bgcolor=#fefefe
| 174067 ||  || — || March 13, 2002 || Socorro || LINEAR || — || align=right data-sort-value="0.80" | 800 m || 
|-id=068 bgcolor=#fefefe
| 174068 ||  || — || March 13, 2002 || Socorro || LINEAR || V || align=right | 1.4 km || 
|-id=069 bgcolor=#fefefe
| 174069 ||  || — || March 13, 2002 || Socorro || LINEAR || FLO || align=right | 1.0 km || 
|-id=070 bgcolor=#fefefe
| 174070 ||  || — || March 13, 2002 || Palomar || NEAT || NYS || align=right | 1.3 km || 
|-id=071 bgcolor=#fefefe
| 174071 ||  || — || March 3, 2002 || Haleakala || NEAT || — || align=right | 1.5 km || 
|-id=072 bgcolor=#fefefe
| 174072 ||  || — || March 9, 2002 || Anderson Mesa || LONEOS || FLO || align=right | 1.9 km || 
|-id=073 bgcolor=#fefefe
| 174073 ||  || — || March 13, 2002 || Kitt Peak || Spacewatch || — || align=right | 1.0 km || 
|-id=074 bgcolor=#d6d6d6
| 174074 ||  || — || March 13, 2002 || Socorro || LINEAR || 3:2 || align=right | 8.1 km || 
|-id=075 bgcolor=#fefefe
| 174075 ||  || — || March 15, 2002 || Palomar || NEAT || — || align=right | 2.6 km || 
|-id=076 bgcolor=#fefefe
| 174076 ||  || — || March 18, 2002 || Bohyunsan || Bohyunsan Obs. || — || align=right data-sort-value="0.94" | 940 m || 
|-id=077 bgcolor=#d6d6d6
| 174077 ||  || — || March 19, 2002 || Anderson Mesa || LONEOS || 3:2 || align=right | 9.0 km || 
|-id=078 bgcolor=#fefefe
| 174078 ||  || — || April 15, 2002 || Socorro || LINEAR || FLO || align=right data-sort-value="0.99" | 990 m || 
|-id=079 bgcolor=#fefefe
| 174079 ||  || — || April 1, 2002 || Palomar || NEAT || MAS || align=right | 1.2 km || 
|-id=080 bgcolor=#d6d6d6
| 174080 ||  || — || April 2, 2002 || Palomar || NEAT || — || align=right | 5.7 km || 
|-id=081 bgcolor=#fefefe
| 174081 ||  || — || April 3, 2002 || Kitt Peak || Spacewatch || — || align=right | 1.0 km || 
|-id=082 bgcolor=#fefefe
| 174082 ||  || — || April 4, 2002 || Palomar || NEAT || — || align=right | 1.5 km || 
|-id=083 bgcolor=#fefefe
| 174083 ||  || — || April 8, 2002 || Palomar || NEAT || FLO || align=right | 2.6 km || 
|-id=084 bgcolor=#fefefe
| 174084 ||  || — || April 9, 2002 || Anderson Mesa || LONEOS || — || align=right | 1.3 km || 
|-id=085 bgcolor=#fefefe
| 174085 ||  || — || April 10, 2002 || Socorro || LINEAR || — || align=right | 1.5 km || 
|-id=086 bgcolor=#fefefe
| 174086 ||  || — || April 11, 2002 || Socorro || LINEAR || — || align=right | 1.5 km || 
|-id=087 bgcolor=#fefefe
| 174087 ||  || — || April 10, 2002 || Socorro || LINEAR || — || align=right | 1.2 km || 
|-id=088 bgcolor=#fefefe
| 174088 ||  || — || April 12, 2002 || Socorro || LINEAR || — || align=right | 1.4 km || 
|-id=089 bgcolor=#d6d6d6
| 174089 ||  || — || April 12, 2002 || Socorro || LINEAR || 3:2 || align=right | 9.1 km || 
|-id=090 bgcolor=#fefefe
| 174090 ||  || — || April 13, 2002 || Kitt Peak || Spacewatch || — || align=right | 1.1 km || 
|-id=091 bgcolor=#fefefe
| 174091 ||  || — || April 14, 2002 || Socorro || LINEAR || — || align=right data-sort-value="0.86" | 860 m || 
|-id=092 bgcolor=#fefefe
| 174092 ||  || — || April 14, 2002 || Palomar || NEAT || fast? || align=right | 1.1 km || 
|-id=093 bgcolor=#fefefe
| 174093 ||  || — || April 14, 2002 || Haleakala || NEAT || V || align=right data-sort-value="0.95" | 950 m || 
|-id=094 bgcolor=#fefefe
| 174094 ||  || — || April 9, 2002 || Kitt Peak || Spacewatch || FLO || align=right data-sort-value="0.76" | 760 m || 
|-id=095 bgcolor=#fefefe
| 174095 ||  || — || April 16, 2002 || Socorro || LINEAR || FLO || align=right data-sort-value="0.98" | 980 m || 
|-id=096 bgcolor=#fefefe
| 174096 ||  || — || May 4, 2002 || Desert Eagle || W. K. Y. Yeung || FLO || align=right | 1.1 km || 
|-id=097 bgcolor=#fefefe
| 174097 ||  || — || May 8, 2002 || Socorro || LINEAR || — || align=right | 1.0 km || 
|-id=098 bgcolor=#fefefe
| 174098 ||  || — || May 8, 2002 || Socorro || LINEAR || FLO || align=right | 1.0 km || 
|-id=099 bgcolor=#fefefe
| 174099 ||  || — || May 7, 2002 || Palomar || NEAT || — || align=right | 1.5 km || 
|-id=100 bgcolor=#fefefe
| 174100 ||  || — || May 8, 2002 || Socorro || LINEAR || — || align=right | 1.3 km || 
|}

174101–174200 

|-bgcolor=#fefefe
| 174101 ||  || — || May 8, 2002 || Socorro || LINEAR || FLO || align=right data-sort-value="0.97" | 970 m || 
|-id=102 bgcolor=#fefefe
| 174102 ||  || — || May 8, 2002 || Haleakala || NEAT || FLO || align=right | 1.00 km || 
|-id=103 bgcolor=#fefefe
| 174103 ||  || — || May 8, 2002 || Haleakala || NEAT || — || align=right | 1.5 km || 
|-id=104 bgcolor=#fefefe
| 174104 ||  || — || May 9, 2002 || Socorro || LINEAR || FLO || align=right | 1.00 km || 
|-id=105 bgcolor=#fefefe
| 174105 ||  || — || May 9, 2002 || Socorro || LINEAR || — || align=right | 1.0 km || 
|-id=106 bgcolor=#fefefe
| 174106 ||  || — || May 9, 2002 || Socorro || LINEAR || NYS || align=right | 1.0 km || 
|-id=107 bgcolor=#fefefe
| 174107 ||  || — || May 9, 2002 || Socorro || LINEAR || — || align=right | 2.3 km || 
|-id=108 bgcolor=#fefefe
| 174108 ||  || — || May 10, 2002 || Kitt Peak || Spacewatch || V || align=right | 1.0 km || 
|-id=109 bgcolor=#fefefe
| 174109 ||  || — || May 8, 2002 || Socorro || LINEAR || — || align=right | 1.0 km || 
|-id=110 bgcolor=#fefefe
| 174110 ||  || — || May 9, 2002 || Socorro || LINEAR || MAS || align=right | 1.4 km || 
|-id=111 bgcolor=#fefefe
| 174111 ||  || — || May 8, 2002 || Socorro || LINEAR || V || align=right | 1.4 km || 
|-id=112 bgcolor=#fefefe
| 174112 ||  || — || May 11, 2002 || Socorro || LINEAR || FLO || align=right | 1.7 km || 
|-id=113 bgcolor=#fefefe
| 174113 ||  || — || May 11, 2002 || Socorro || LINEAR || — || align=right | 1.9 km || 
|-id=114 bgcolor=#d6d6d6
| 174114 ||  || — || May 11, 2002 || Socorro || LINEAR || 3:2 || align=right | 7.4 km || 
|-id=115 bgcolor=#fefefe
| 174115 ||  || — || May 11, 2002 || Socorro || LINEAR || — || align=right | 1.1 km || 
|-id=116 bgcolor=#fefefe
| 174116 ||  || — || May 11, 2002 || Socorro || LINEAR || FLO || align=right data-sort-value="0.97" | 970 m || 
|-id=117 bgcolor=#fefefe
| 174117 ||  || — || May 12, 2002 || Socorro || LINEAR || — || align=right | 1.1 km || 
|-id=118 bgcolor=#fefefe
| 174118 ||  || — || May 7, 2002 || Anderson Mesa || LONEOS || FLO || align=right data-sort-value="0.93" | 930 m || 
|-id=119 bgcolor=#fefefe
| 174119 ||  || — || May 9, 2002 || Palomar || NEAT || MAS || align=right | 1.2 km || 
|-id=120 bgcolor=#fefefe
| 174120 ||  || — || May 15, 2002 || Socorro || LINEAR || CIM || align=right | 2.2 km || 
|-id=121 bgcolor=#d6d6d6
| 174121 ||  || — || May 16, 2002 || Socorro || LINEAR || 3:2 || align=right | 6.5 km || 
|-id=122 bgcolor=#fefefe
| 174122 ||  || — || May 18, 2002 || Palomar || NEAT || — || align=right data-sort-value="0.93" | 930 m || 
|-id=123 bgcolor=#E9E9E9
| 174123 ||  || — || June 2, 2002 || Palomar || NEAT || — || align=right | 3.5 km || 
|-id=124 bgcolor=#fefefe
| 174124 ||  || — || June 5, 2002 || Socorro || LINEAR || — || align=right | 1.3 km || 
|-id=125 bgcolor=#fefefe
| 174125 ||  || — || June 5, 2002 || Socorro || LINEAR || — || align=right | 3.0 km || 
|-id=126 bgcolor=#fefefe
| 174126 ||  || — || June 6, 2002 || Socorro || LINEAR || V || align=right data-sort-value="0.88" | 880 m || 
|-id=127 bgcolor=#fefefe
| 174127 ||  || — || June 6, 2002 || Socorro || LINEAR || — || align=right | 1.7 km || 
|-id=128 bgcolor=#fefefe
| 174128 ||  || — || June 6, 2002 || Socorro || LINEAR || NYS || align=right | 1.1 km || 
|-id=129 bgcolor=#fefefe
| 174129 ||  || — || June 8, 2002 || Socorro || LINEAR || — || align=right | 1.6 km || 
|-id=130 bgcolor=#fefefe
| 174130 ||  || — || June 8, 2002 || Socorro || LINEAR || — || align=right | 1.3 km || 
|-id=131 bgcolor=#E9E9E9
| 174131 ||  || — || June 10, 2002 || Socorro || LINEAR || — || align=right | 2.1 km || 
|-id=132 bgcolor=#fefefe
| 174132 ||  || — || June 16, 2002 || Palomar || NEAT || MAS || align=right | 1.5 km || 
|-id=133 bgcolor=#fefefe
| 174133 ||  || — || July 4, 2002 || Palomar || NEAT || NYS || align=right | 1.1 km || 
|-id=134 bgcolor=#E9E9E9
| 174134 ||  || — || July 4, 2002 || Palomar || NEAT || — || align=right | 1.7 km || 
|-id=135 bgcolor=#E9E9E9
| 174135 ||  || — || July 4, 2002 || Palomar || NEAT || — || align=right | 1.8 km || 
|-id=136 bgcolor=#fefefe
| 174136 ||  || — || July 5, 2002 || Socorro || LINEAR || V || align=right | 1.2 km || 
|-id=137 bgcolor=#fefefe
| 174137 ||  || — || July 9, 2002 || Socorro || LINEAR || — || align=right | 1.9 km || 
|-id=138 bgcolor=#E9E9E9
| 174138 ||  || — || July 9, 2002 || Socorro || LINEAR || — || align=right | 4.9 km || 
|-id=139 bgcolor=#E9E9E9
| 174139 ||  || — || July 13, 2002 || Haleakala || NEAT || — || align=right | 2.8 km || 
|-id=140 bgcolor=#E9E9E9
| 174140 ||  || — || July 14, 2002 || Palomar || NEAT || — || align=right | 1.7 km || 
|-id=141 bgcolor=#fefefe
| 174141 ||  || — || July 14, 2002 || Palomar || NEAT || NYS || align=right data-sort-value="0.96" | 960 m || 
|-id=142 bgcolor=#E9E9E9
| 174142 ||  || — || July 9, 2002 || Socorro || LINEAR || — || align=right | 2.5 km || 
|-id=143 bgcolor=#E9E9E9
| 174143 ||  || — || July 15, 2002 || Palomar || NEAT || — || align=right | 2.8 km || 
|-id=144 bgcolor=#fefefe
| 174144 ||  || — || July 14, 2002 || Palomar || NEAT || — || align=right data-sort-value="0.81" | 810 m || 
|-id=145 bgcolor=#E9E9E9
| 174145 ||  || — || July 17, 2002 || Socorro || LINEAR || ADE || align=right | 3.2 km || 
|-id=146 bgcolor=#E9E9E9
| 174146 ||  || — || July 22, 2002 || Palomar || NEAT || — || align=right | 2.2 km || 
|-id=147 bgcolor=#fefefe
| 174147 ||  || — || July 18, 2002 || Palomar || NEAT || NYS || align=right data-sort-value="0.97" | 970 m || 
|-id=148 bgcolor=#E9E9E9
| 174148 ||  || — || July 18, 2002 || Socorro || LINEAR || — || align=right | 2.0 km || 
|-id=149 bgcolor=#fefefe
| 174149 ||  || — || July 22, 2002 || Palomar || NEAT || — || align=right | 1.4 km || 
|-id=150 bgcolor=#E9E9E9
| 174150 || 2002 PD || — || August 1, 2002 || Reedy Creek || J. Broughton || — || align=right | 1.5 km || 
|-id=151 bgcolor=#fefefe
| 174151 ||  || — || August 6, 2002 || Palomar || NEAT || V || align=right | 1.0 km || 
|-id=152 bgcolor=#fefefe
| 174152 ||  || — || August 6, 2002 || Palomar || NEAT || — || align=right | 1.0 km || 
|-id=153 bgcolor=#E9E9E9
| 174153 ||  || — || August 9, 2002 || Socorro || LINEAR || — || align=right | 1.8 km || 
|-id=154 bgcolor=#E9E9E9
| 174154 ||  || — || August 9, 2002 || Socorro || LINEAR || — || align=right | 1.6 km || 
|-id=155 bgcolor=#E9E9E9
| 174155 ||  || — || August 10, 2002 || Socorro || LINEAR || JUN || align=right | 2.4 km || 
|-id=156 bgcolor=#E9E9E9
| 174156 ||  || — || August 10, 2002 || Socorro || LINEAR || ADE || align=right | 4.1 km || 
|-id=157 bgcolor=#E9E9E9
| 174157 ||  || — || August 11, 2002 || Socorro || LINEAR || — || align=right | 1.9 km || 
|-id=158 bgcolor=#fefefe
| 174158 ||  || — || August 8, 2002 || Palomar || NEAT || FLO || align=right data-sort-value="0.85" | 850 m || 
|-id=159 bgcolor=#E9E9E9
| 174159 ||  || — || August 3, 2002 || Palomar || NEAT || GEF || align=right | 2.2 km || 
|-id=160 bgcolor=#fefefe
| 174160 ||  || — || August 6, 2002 || Palomar || NEAT || — || align=right | 1.5 km || 
|-id=161 bgcolor=#E9E9E9
| 174161 ||  || — || August 6, 2002 || Palomar || NEAT || — || align=right | 1.7 km || 
|-id=162 bgcolor=#fefefe
| 174162 ||  || — || August 6, 2002 || Palomar || NEAT || EUT || align=right | 1.0 km || 
|-id=163 bgcolor=#E9E9E9
| 174163 ||  || — || August 11, 2002 || Socorro || LINEAR || ADE || align=right | 4.3 km || 
|-id=164 bgcolor=#E9E9E9
| 174164 ||  || — || August 11, 2002 || Socorro || LINEAR || — || align=right | 3.7 km || 
|-id=165 bgcolor=#fefefe
| 174165 ||  || — || August 12, 2002 || Socorro || LINEAR || — || align=right | 1.6 km || 
|-id=166 bgcolor=#E9E9E9
| 174166 ||  || — || August 11, 2002 || Haleakala || NEAT || MIT || align=right | 4.5 km || 
|-id=167 bgcolor=#fefefe
| 174167 ||  || — || August 13, 2002 || Palomar || NEAT || NYS || align=right data-sort-value="0.78" | 780 m || 
|-id=168 bgcolor=#fefefe
| 174168 ||  || — || August 10, 2002 || Socorro || LINEAR || V || align=right | 1.2 km || 
|-id=169 bgcolor=#E9E9E9
| 174169 ||  || — || August 13, 2002 || Kitt Peak || Spacewatch || — || align=right | 1.1 km || 
|-id=170 bgcolor=#E9E9E9
| 174170 ||  || — || August 11, 2002 || Socorro || LINEAR || MAR || align=right | 2.8 km || 
|-id=171 bgcolor=#E9E9E9
| 174171 ||  || — || August 13, 2002 || Socorro || LINEAR || ADE || align=right | 4.8 km || 
|-id=172 bgcolor=#E9E9E9
| 174172 ||  || — || August 13, 2002 || Socorro || LINEAR || — || align=right | 3.9 km || 
|-id=173 bgcolor=#E9E9E9
| 174173 ||  || — || August 14, 2002 || Socorro || LINEAR || — || align=right | 2.4 km || 
|-id=174 bgcolor=#fefefe
| 174174 ||  || — || August 14, 2002 || Socorro || LINEAR || — || align=right | 2.0 km || 
|-id=175 bgcolor=#E9E9E9
| 174175 ||  || — || August 14, 2002 || Socorro || LINEAR || — || align=right | 3.3 km || 
|-id=176 bgcolor=#E9E9E9
| 174176 ||  || — || August 13, 2002 || Anderson Mesa || LONEOS || IAN || align=right | 1.1 km || 
|-id=177 bgcolor=#E9E9E9
| 174177 ||  || — || August 14, 2002 || Palomar || NEAT || — || align=right | 4.6 km || 
|-id=178 bgcolor=#E9E9E9
| 174178 ||  || — || August 13, 2002 || Anderson Mesa || LONEOS || — || align=right | 2.4 km || 
|-id=179 bgcolor=#E9E9E9
| 174179 ||  || — || August 14, 2002 || Socorro || LINEAR || — || align=right | 1.9 km || 
|-id=180 bgcolor=#E9E9E9
| 174180 ||  || — || August 13, 2002 || Socorro || LINEAR || — || align=right | 1.9 km || 
|-id=181 bgcolor=#fefefe
| 174181 ||  || — || August 14, 2002 || Socorro || LINEAR || — || align=right | 1.1 km || 
|-id=182 bgcolor=#E9E9E9
| 174182 ||  || — || August 14, 2002 || Socorro || LINEAR || JUN || align=right | 2.4 km || 
|-id=183 bgcolor=#E9E9E9
| 174183 ||  || — || August 15, 2002 || Kitt Peak || Spacewatch || — || align=right | 2.5 km || 
|-id=184 bgcolor=#E9E9E9
| 174184 ||  || — || August 15, 2002 || Palomar || NEAT || — || align=right | 3.2 km || 
|-id=185 bgcolor=#E9E9E9
| 174185 ||  || — || August 8, 2002 || Palomar || S. F. Hönig || — || align=right | 1.6 km || 
|-id=186 bgcolor=#fefefe
| 174186 ||  || — || August 8, 2002 || Palomar || S. F. Hönig || — || align=right | 1.3 km || 
|-id=187 bgcolor=#E9E9E9
| 174187 ||  || — || August 9, 2002 || Haleakala || A. Lowe || — || align=right | 2.9 km || 
|-id=188 bgcolor=#fefefe
| 174188 ||  || — || August 16, 2002 || Haleakala || NEAT || ERI || align=right | 2.0 km || 
|-id=189 bgcolor=#fefefe
| 174189 ||  || — || August 16, 2002 || Palomar || NEAT || — || align=right | 1.3 km || 
|-id=190 bgcolor=#E9E9E9
| 174190 ||  || — || August 16, 2002 || Haleakala || NEAT || — || align=right | 2.6 km || 
|-id=191 bgcolor=#fefefe
| 174191 ||  || — || August 19, 2002 || Palomar || NEAT || V || align=right | 1.0 km || 
|-id=192 bgcolor=#fefefe
| 174192 ||  || — || August 26, 2002 || Palomar || NEAT || — || align=right | 1.5 km || 
|-id=193 bgcolor=#fefefe
| 174193 ||  || — || August 27, 2002 || Palomar || NEAT || — || align=right | 1.3 km || 
|-id=194 bgcolor=#E9E9E9
| 174194 ||  || — || August 28, 2002 || Palomar || NEAT || — || align=right | 4.7 km || 
|-id=195 bgcolor=#fefefe
| 174195 ||  || — || August 29, 2002 || Palomar || NEAT || NYS || align=right | 1.0 km || 
|-id=196 bgcolor=#E9E9E9
| 174196 ||  || — || August 29, 2002 || Palomar || NEAT || — || align=right | 2.9 km || 
|-id=197 bgcolor=#d6d6d6
| 174197 ||  || — || August 28, 2002 || Palomar || NEAT || KOR || align=right | 2.3 km || 
|-id=198 bgcolor=#fefefe
| 174198 ||  || — || August 29, 2002 || Palomar || NEAT || — || align=right | 1.5 km || 
|-id=199 bgcolor=#fefefe
| 174199 ||  || — || August 30, 2002 || Palomar || NEAT || — || align=right | 1.7 km || 
|-id=200 bgcolor=#E9E9E9
| 174200 ||  || — || August 31, 2002 || Socorro || LINEAR || — || align=right | 2.4 km || 
|}

174201–174300 

|-bgcolor=#E9E9E9
| 174201 ||  || — || August 18, 2002 || Palomar || S. F. Hönig || — || align=right | 1.9 km || 
|-id=202 bgcolor=#E9E9E9
| 174202 ||  || — || August 18, 2002 || Palomar || S. F. Hönig || — || align=right | 1.2 km || 
|-id=203 bgcolor=#E9E9E9
| 174203 ||  || — || August 28, 2002 || Palomar || R. Matson || AER || align=right | 2.1 km || 
|-id=204 bgcolor=#E9E9E9
| 174204 ||  || — || August 18, 2002 || Palomar || NEAT || — || align=right | 1.6 km || 
|-id=205 bgcolor=#E9E9E9
| 174205 ||  || — || August 18, 2002 || Palomar || NEAT || — || align=right | 4.0 km || 
|-id=206 bgcolor=#E9E9E9
| 174206 ||  || — || August 27, 2002 || Palomar || NEAT || — || align=right | 1.1 km || 
|-id=207 bgcolor=#fefefe
| 174207 ||  || — || August 28, 2002 || Palomar || NEAT || NYS || align=right data-sort-value="0.94" | 940 m || 
|-id=208 bgcolor=#E9E9E9
| 174208 ||  || — || August 20, 2002 || Palomar || NEAT || — || align=right | 1.4 km || 
|-id=209 bgcolor=#fefefe
| 174209 ||  || — || August 28, 2002 || Palomar || NEAT || V || align=right | 1.1 km || 
|-id=210 bgcolor=#E9E9E9
| 174210 ||  || — || August 16, 2002 || Palomar || NEAT || — || align=right | 1.5 km || 
|-id=211 bgcolor=#fefefe
| 174211 ||  || — || August 18, 2002 || Palomar || NEAT || — || align=right | 1.2 km || 
|-id=212 bgcolor=#E9E9E9
| 174212 ||  || — || August 18, 2002 || Palomar || NEAT || — || align=right | 1.8 km || 
|-id=213 bgcolor=#fefefe
| 174213 ||  || — || August 17, 2002 || Palomar || NEAT || — || align=right | 1.1 km || 
|-id=214 bgcolor=#fefefe
| 174214 ||  || — || August 27, 2002 || Palomar || NEAT || MAS || align=right | 1.1 km || 
|-id=215 bgcolor=#fefefe
| 174215 ||  || — || August 16, 2002 || Palomar || NEAT || — || align=right | 1.4 km || 
|-id=216 bgcolor=#E9E9E9
| 174216 ||  || — || August 29, 2002 || Palomar || NEAT || — || align=right | 2.0 km || 
|-id=217 bgcolor=#E9E9E9
| 174217 ||  || — || September 4, 2002 || Anderson Mesa || LONEOS || MAR || align=right | 2.0 km || 
|-id=218 bgcolor=#E9E9E9
| 174218 ||  || — || September 4, 2002 || Anderson Mesa || LONEOS || — || align=right | 1.7 km || 
|-id=219 bgcolor=#E9E9E9
| 174219 ||  || — || September 4, 2002 || Anderson Mesa || LONEOS || — || align=right | 2.0 km || 
|-id=220 bgcolor=#E9E9E9
| 174220 ||  || — || September 4, 2002 || Anderson Mesa || LONEOS || — || align=right | 2.1 km || 
|-id=221 bgcolor=#E9E9E9
| 174221 ||  || — || September 4, 2002 || Anderson Mesa || LONEOS || — || align=right | 1.5 km || 
|-id=222 bgcolor=#E9E9E9
| 174222 ||  || — || September 4, 2002 || Anderson Mesa || LONEOS || — || align=right | 2.6 km || 
|-id=223 bgcolor=#fefefe
| 174223 ||  || — || September 4, 2002 || Anderson Mesa || LONEOS || — || align=right | 1.2 km || 
|-id=224 bgcolor=#E9E9E9
| 174224 ||  || — || September 4, 2002 || Anderson Mesa || LONEOS || — || align=right | 2.0 km || 
|-id=225 bgcolor=#E9E9E9
| 174225 ||  || — || September 4, 2002 || Anderson Mesa || LONEOS || HOF || align=right | 5.7 km || 
|-id=226 bgcolor=#E9E9E9
| 174226 ||  || — || September 4, 2002 || Anderson Mesa || LONEOS || CLO || align=right | 3.5 km || 
|-id=227 bgcolor=#E9E9E9
| 174227 ||  || — || September 5, 2002 || Socorro || LINEAR || — || align=right | 1.4 km || 
|-id=228 bgcolor=#E9E9E9
| 174228 ||  || — || September 5, 2002 || Anderson Mesa || LONEOS || — || align=right | 1.3 km || 
|-id=229 bgcolor=#E9E9E9
| 174229 ||  || — || September 5, 2002 || Socorro || LINEAR || — || align=right | 4.5 km || 
|-id=230 bgcolor=#E9E9E9
| 174230 ||  || — || September 3, 2002 || Palomar || NEAT || — || align=right | 2.5 km || 
|-id=231 bgcolor=#E9E9E9
| 174231 ||  || — || September 5, 2002 || Socorro || LINEAR || — || align=right | 2.2 km || 
|-id=232 bgcolor=#E9E9E9
| 174232 ||  || — || September 5, 2002 || Socorro || LINEAR || — || align=right | 1.4 km || 
|-id=233 bgcolor=#E9E9E9
| 174233 ||  || — || September 5, 2002 || Socorro || LINEAR || — || align=right | 6.8 km || 
|-id=234 bgcolor=#E9E9E9
| 174234 ||  || — || September 5, 2002 || Socorro || LINEAR || MRX || align=right | 1.8 km || 
|-id=235 bgcolor=#E9E9E9
| 174235 ||  || — || September 5, 2002 || Socorro || LINEAR || — || align=right | 1.6 km || 
|-id=236 bgcolor=#E9E9E9
| 174236 ||  || — || September 8, 2002 || Campo Imperatore || CINEOS || — || align=right | 2.5 km || 
|-id=237 bgcolor=#E9E9E9
| 174237 ||  || — || September 8, 2002 || Haleakala || NEAT || — || align=right | 3.8 km || 
|-id=238 bgcolor=#E9E9E9
| 174238 ||  || — || September 8, 2002 || Haleakala || NEAT || GEF || align=right | 1.8 km || 
|-id=239 bgcolor=#E9E9E9
| 174239 ||  || — || September 9, 2002 || Palomar || NEAT || — || align=right | 2.6 km || 
|-id=240 bgcolor=#E9E9E9
| 174240 ||  || — || September 10, 2002 || Kvistaberg || UDAS || — || align=right | 1.7 km || 
|-id=241 bgcolor=#fefefe
| 174241 ||  || — || September 11, 2002 || Palomar || NEAT || — || align=right | 2.8 km || 
|-id=242 bgcolor=#E9E9E9
| 174242 ||  || — || September 11, 2002 || Palomar || NEAT || — || align=right | 1.5 km || 
|-id=243 bgcolor=#E9E9E9
| 174243 ||  || — || September 11, 2002 || Palomar || NEAT || — || align=right | 3.0 km || 
|-id=244 bgcolor=#E9E9E9
| 174244 ||  || — || September 10, 2002 || Haleakala || NEAT || — || align=right data-sort-value="0.90" | 900 m || 
|-id=245 bgcolor=#E9E9E9
| 174245 ||  || — || September 11, 2002 || Palomar || NEAT || HEN || align=right | 1.8 km || 
|-id=246 bgcolor=#fefefe
| 174246 ||  || — || September 11, 2002 || Palomar || NEAT || FLO || align=right | 1.5 km || 
|-id=247 bgcolor=#E9E9E9
| 174247 ||  || — || September 13, 2002 || Palomar || NEAT || — || align=right | 1.7 km || 
|-id=248 bgcolor=#E9E9E9
| 174248 ||  || — || September 13, 2002 || Anderson Mesa || LONEOS || ADE || align=right | 3.8 km || 
|-id=249 bgcolor=#E9E9E9
| 174249 ||  || — || September 13, 2002 || Palomar || NEAT || — || align=right | 1.5 km || 
|-id=250 bgcolor=#E9E9E9
| 174250 ||  || — || September 13, 2002 || Palomar || NEAT || — || align=right | 1.3 km || 
|-id=251 bgcolor=#E9E9E9
| 174251 ||  || — || September 12, 2002 || Palomar || NEAT || — || align=right | 2.9 km || 
|-id=252 bgcolor=#E9E9E9
| 174252 ||  || — || September 12, 2002 || Palomar || NEAT || — || align=right | 3.5 km || 
|-id=253 bgcolor=#E9E9E9
| 174253 ||  || — || September 14, 2002 || Palomar || NEAT || — || align=right | 1.8 km || 
|-id=254 bgcolor=#E9E9E9
| 174254 ||  || — || September 13, 2002 || Palomar || NEAT || ADE || align=right | 2.8 km || 
|-id=255 bgcolor=#E9E9E9
| 174255 ||  || — || September 13, 2002 || Socorro || LINEAR || — || align=right | 1.8 km || 
|-id=256 bgcolor=#E9E9E9
| 174256 ||  || — || September 13, 2002 || Socorro || LINEAR || — || align=right | 1.7 km || 
|-id=257 bgcolor=#E9E9E9
| 174257 ||  || — || September 14, 2002 || Haleakala || NEAT || — || align=right | 1.4 km || 
|-id=258 bgcolor=#E9E9E9
| 174258 ||  || — || September 13, 2002 || Anderson Mesa || LONEOS || — || align=right | 2.5 km || 
|-id=259 bgcolor=#fefefe
| 174259 ||  || — || September 15, 2002 || Palomar || NEAT || V || align=right | 1.1 km || 
|-id=260 bgcolor=#E9E9E9
| 174260 ||  || — || September 13, 2002 || Anderson Mesa || LONEOS || — || align=right | 2.6 km || 
|-id=261 bgcolor=#E9E9E9
| 174261 ||  || — || September 14, 2002 || Palomar || NEAT || — || align=right | 1.6 km || 
|-id=262 bgcolor=#E9E9E9
| 174262 ||  || — || September 15, 2002 || Haleakala || NEAT || — || align=right | 2.8 km || 
|-id=263 bgcolor=#fefefe
| 174263 ||  || — || September 14, 2002 || Palomar || R. Matson || NYS || align=right data-sort-value="0.98" | 980 m || 
|-id=264 bgcolor=#E9E9E9
| 174264 ||  || — || September 14, 2002 || Palomar || R. Matson || — || align=right | 2.6 km || 
|-id=265 bgcolor=#fefefe
| 174265 ||  || — || September 14, 2002 || Palomar || R. Matson || V || align=right | 1.1 km || 
|-id=266 bgcolor=#fefefe
| 174266 ||  || — || September 4, 2002 || Palomar || S. F. Hönig || FLO || align=right data-sort-value="0.98" | 980 m || 
|-id=267 bgcolor=#E9E9E9
| 174267 ||  || — || September 14, 2002 || Palomar || NEAT || — || align=right | 1.3 km || 
|-id=268 bgcolor=#E9E9E9
| 174268 ||  || — || September 15, 2002 || Anderson Mesa || LONEOS || — || align=right | 5.4 km || 
|-id=269 bgcolor=#E9E9E9
| 174269 ||  || — || September 1, 2002 || Palomar || NEAT || — || align=right | 1.7 km || 
|-id=270 bgcolor=#E9E9E9
| 174270 ||  || — || September 27, 2002 || Palomar || NEAT || — || align=right | 2.3 km || 
|-id=271 bgcolor=#E9E9E9
| 174271 ||  || — || September 27, 2002 || Palomar || NEAT || — || align=right | 3.1 km || 
|-id=272 bgcolor=#E9E9E9
| 174272 ||  || — || September 27, 2002 || Palomar || NEAT || — || align=right | 2.5 km || 
|-id=273 bgcolor=#E9E9E9
| 174273 ||  || — || September 27, 2002 || Palomar || NEAT || GEF || align=right | 2.0 km || 
|-id=274 bgcolor=#E9E9E9
| 174274 ||  || — || September 27, 2002 || Palomar || NEAT || — || align=right | 1.6 km || 
|-id=275 bgcolor=#E9E9E9
| 174275 ||  || — || September 27, 2002 || Palomar || NEAT || — || align=right | 1.5 km || 
|-id=276 bgcolor=#E9E9E9
| 174276 ||  || — || September 27, 2002 || Palomar || NEAT || — || align=right | 1.9 km || 
|-id=277 bgcolor=#fefefe
| 174277 ||  || — || September 26, 2002 || Palomar || NEAT || NYS || align=right data-sort-value="0.98" | 980 m || 
|-id=278 bgcolor=#E9E9E9
| 174278 ||  || — || September 26, 2002 || Palomar || NEAT || — || align=right | 2.9 km || 
|-id=279 bgcolor=#E9E9E9
| 174279 ||  || — || September 29, 2002 || Haleakala || NEAT || — || align=right | 2.2 km || 
|-id=280 bgcolor=#E9E9E9
| 174280 ||  || — || September 29, 2002 || Haleakala || NEAT || — || align=right | 2.6 km || 
|-id=281 bgcolor=#E9E9E9
| 174281 Lonský ||  ||  || September 30, 2002 || Ondřejov || P. Pravec || — || align=right | 2.6 km || 
|-id=282 bgcolor=#E9E9E9
| 174282 ||  || — || September 28, 2002 || Haleakala || NEAT || WIT || align=right | 1.6 km || 
|-id=283 bgcolor=#E9E9E9
| 174283 ||  || — || September 28, 2002 || Haleakala || NEAT || — || align=right | 2.0 km || 
|-id=284 bgcolor=#E9E9E9
| 174284 ||  || — || September 28, 2002 || Haleakala || NEAT || — || align=right | 2.0 km || 
|-id=285 bgcolor=#E9E9E9
| 174285 ||  || — || September 29, 2002 || Haleakala || NEAT || MIS || align=right | 3.9 km || 
|-id=286 bgcolor=#E9E9E9
| 174286 ||  || — || September 29, 2002 || Haleakala || NEAT || — || align=right | 2.5 km || 
|-id=287 bgcolor=#FA8072
| 174287 ||  || — || September 29, 2002 || Haleakala || NEAT || — || align=right | 1.9 km || 
|-id=288 bgcolor=#E9E9E9
| 174288 ||  || — || September 30, 2002 || Socorro || LINEAR || HEN || align=right | 1.6 km || 
|-id=289 bgcolor=#E9E9E9
| 174289 ||  || — || September 29, 2002 || Haleakala || NEAT || — || align=right | 4.2 km || 
|-id=290 bgcolor=#E9E9E9
| 174290 ||  || — || September 29, 2002 || Haleakala || NEAT || — || align=right | 2.5 km || 
|-id=291 bgcolor=#E9E9E9
| 174291 ||  || — || September 30, 2002 || Socorro || LINEAR || — || align=right | 2.8 km || 
|-id=292 bgcolor=#E9E9E9
| 174292 ||  || — || September 30, 2002 || Haleakala || NEAT || — || align=right | 3.3 km || 
|-id=293 bgcolor=#E9E9E9
| 174293 ||  || — || September 18, 2002 || Palomar || NEAT || — || align=right | 2.9 km || 
|-id=294 bgcolor=#E9E9E9
| 174294 ||  || — || September 30, 2002 || Haleakala || NEAT || — || align=right | 1.5 km || 
|-id=295 bgcolor=#E9E9E9
| 174295 ||  || — || September 30, 2002 || Haleakala || NEAT || — || align=right | 2.8 km || 
|-id=296 bgcolor=#E9E9E9
| 174296 ||  || — || October 1, 2002 || Anderson Mesa || LONEOS || — || align=right | 2.2 km || 
|-id=297 bgcolor=#E9E9E9
| 174297 ||  || — || October 1, 2002 || Anderson Mesa || LONEOS || — || align=right | 4.5 km || 
|-id=298 bgcolor=#E9E9E9
| 174298 ||  || — || October 2, 2002 || Socorro || LINEAR || — || align=right | 1.3 km || 
|-id=299 bgcolor=#fefefe
| 174299 ||  || — || October 2, 2002 || Socorro || LINEAR || — || align=right | 1.4 km || 
|-id=300 bgcolor=#E9E9E9
| 174300 ||  || — || October 2, 2002 || Socorro || LINEAR || — || align=right | 2.6 km || 
|}

174301–174400 

|-bgcolor=#E9E9E9
| 174301 ||  || — || October 2, 2002 || Socorro || LINEAR || — || align=right | 2.5 km || 
|-id=302 bgcolor=#E9E9E9
| 174302 ||  || — || October 2, 2002 || Socorro || LINEAR || MRX || align=right | 1.6 km || 
|-id=303 bgcolor=#E9E9E9
| 174303 ||  || — || October 2, 2002 || Socorro || LINEAR || — || align=right | 4.2 km || 
|-id=304 bgcolor=#E9E9E9
| 174304 ||  || — || October 2, 2002 || Socorro || LINEAR || — || align=right | 2.6 km || 
|-id=305 bgcolor=#E9E9E9
| 174305 ||  || — || October 2, 2002 || Socorro || LINEAR || — || align=right | 1.4 km || 
|-id=306 bgcolor=#E9E9E9
| 174306 ||  || — || October 3, 2002 || Campo Imperatore || CINEOS || — || align=right | 2.4 km || 
|-id=307 bgcolor=#E9E9E9
| 174307 ||  || — || October 3, 2002 || Campo Imperatore || CINEOS || — || align=right | 2.5 km || 
|-id=308 bgcolor=#E9E9E9
| 174308 ||  || — || October 4, 2002 || Campo Imperatore || CINEOS || — || align=right | 1.3 km || 
|-id=309 bgcolor=#E9E9E9
| 174309 ||  || — || October 4, 2002 || Campo Imperatore || CINEOS || — || align=right | 1.9 km || 
|-id=310 bgcolor=#E9E9E9
| 174310 ||  || — || October 3, 2002 || Palomar || NEAT || — || align=right | 2.3 km || 
|-id=311 bgcolor=#E9E9E9
| 174311 ||  || — || October 3, 2002 || Palomar || NEAT || — || align=right | 3.7 km || 
|-id=312 bgcolor=#E9E9E9
| 174312 ||  || — || October 3, 2002 || Palomar || NEAT || — || align=right | 4.3 km || 
|-id=313 bgcolor=#E9E9E9
| 174313 ||  || — || October 1, 2002 || Anderson Mesa || LONEOS || — || align=right | 2.4 km || 
|-id=314 bgcolor=#E9E9E9
| 174314 ||  || — || October 1, 2002 || Anderson Mesa || LONEOS || — || align=right | 3.8 km || 
|-id=315 bgcolor=#E9E9E9
| 174315 ||  || — || October 2, 2002 || Campo Imperatore || CINEOS || VIB || align=right | 3.4 km || 
|-id=316 bgcolor=#E9E9E9
| 174316 ||  || — || October 3, 2002 || Socorro || LINEAR || — || align=right | 1.9 km || 
|-id=317 bgcolor=#E9E9E9
| 174317 ||  || — || October 3, 2002 || Palomar || NEAT || DOR || align=right | 6.2 km || 
|-id=318 bgcolor=#d6d6d6
| 174318 ||  || — || October 3, 2002 || Socorro || LINEAR || — || align=right | 3.5 km || 
|-id=319 bgcolor=#E9E9E9
| 174319 ||  || — || October 2, 2002 || Socorro || LINEAR || — || align=right | 1.2 km || 
|-id=320 bgcolor=#E9E9E9
| 174320 ||  || — || October 2, 2002 || Haleakala || NEAT || — || align=right | 3.0 km || 
|-id=321 bgcolor=#E9E9E9
| 174321 ||  || — || October 2, 2002 || Haleakala || NEAT || — || align=right | 3.2 km || 
|-id=322 bgcolor=#E9E9E9
| 174322 ||  || — || October 3, 2002 || Palomar || NEAT || — || align=right | 2.0 km || 
|-id=323 bgcolor=#E9E9E9
| 174323 ||  || — || October 3, 2002 || Palomar || NEAT || — || align=right | 4.2 km || 
|-id=324 bgcolor=#E9E9E9
| 174324 ||  || — || October 3, 2002 || Palomar || NEAT || — || align=right | 3.4 km || 
|-id=325 bgcolor=#E9E9E9
| 174325 ||  || — || October 3, 2002 || Palomar || NEAT || — || align=right | 2.5 km || 
|-id=326 bgcolor=#E9E9E9
| 174326 ||  || — || October 3, 2002 || Campo Imperatore || CINEOS || — || align=right | 3.1 km || 
|-id=327 bgcolor=#d6d6d6
| 174327 ||  || — || October 4, 2002 || Palomar || NEAT || NAE || align=right | 5.2 km || 
|-id=328 bgcolor=#fefefe
| 174328 ||  || — || October 4, 2002 || Socorro || LINEAR || — || align=right | 1.7 km || 
|-id=329 bgcolor=#E9E9E9
| 174329 ||  || — || October 4, 2002 || Anderson Mesa || LONEOS || — || align=right | 4.3 km || 
|-id=330 bgcolor=#E9E9E9
| 174330 ||  || — || October 4, 2002 || Anderson Mesa || LONEOS || — || align=right | 1.6 km || 
|-id=331 bgcolor=#E9E9E9
| 174331 ||  || — || October 4, 2002 || Anderson Mesa || LONEOS || MAR || align=right | 2.2 km || 
|-id=332 bgcolor=#E9E9E9
| 174332 ||  || — || October 3, 2002 || Socorro || LINEAR || — || align=right | 1.4 km || 
|-id=333 bgcolor=#E9E9E9
| 174333 ||  || — || October 4, 2002 || Socorro || LINEAR || RAF || align=right | 1.4 km || 
|-id=334 bgcolor=#E9E9E9
| 174334 ||  || — || October 5, 2002 || Palomar || NEAT || — || align=right | 4.4 km || 
|-id=335 bgcolor=#E9E9E9
| 174335 ||  || — || October 3, 2002 || Palomar || NEAT || EUN || align=right | 2.1 km || 
|-id=336 bgcolor=#E9E9E9
| 174336 ||  || — || October 4, 2002 || Palomar || NEAT || EUN || align=right | 2.4 km || 
|-id=337 bgcolor=#E9E9E9
| 174337 ||  || — || October 5, 2002 || Palomar || NEAT || — || align=right | 3.9 km || 
|-id=338 bgcolor=#E9E9E9
| 174338 ||  || — || October 14, 2002 || Socorro || LINEAR || — || align=right | 3.7 km || 
|-id=339 bgcolor=#E9E9E9
| 174339 ||  || — || October 1, 2002 || Socorro || LINEAR || ADE || align=right | 3.6 km || 
|-id=340 bgcolor=#E9E9E9
| 174340 ||  || — || October 3, 2002 || Socorro || LINEAR || — || align=right | 3.3 km || 
|-id=341 bgcolor=#E9E9E9
| 174341 ||  || — || October 4, 2002 || Socorro || LINEAR || — || align=right | 3.4 km || 
|-id=342 bgcolor=#E9E9E9
| 174342 ||  || — || October 6, 2002 || Haleakala || NEAT || — || align=right | 1.8 km || 
|-id=343 bgcolor=#E9E9E9
| 174343 ||  || — || October 6, 2002 || Haleakala || NEAT || — || align=right | 3.0 km || 
|-id=344 bgcolor=#E9E9E9
| 174344 ||  || — || October 6, 2002 || Haleakala || NEAT || — || align=right | 1.7 km || 
|-id=345 bgcolor=#E9E9E9
| 174345 ||  || — || October 8, 2002 || Anderson Mesa || LONEOS || — || align=right | 3.4 km || 
|-id=346 bgcolor=#E9E9E9
| 174346 ||  || — || October 6, 2002 || Socorro || LINEAR || EUN || align=right | 2.4 km || 
|-id=347 bgcolor=#E9E9E9
| 174347 ||  || — || October 6, 2002 || Socorro || LINEAR || — || align=right | 2.1 km || 
|-id=348 bgcolor=#E9E9E9
| 174348 ||  || — || October 7, 2002 || Haleakala || NEAT || EUN || align=right | 2.1 km || 
|-id=349 bgcolor=#E9E9E9
| 174349 ||  || — || October 9, 2002 || Anderson Mesa || LONEOS || — || align=right | 2.3 km || 
|-id=350 bgcolor=#E9E9E9
| 174350 ||  || — || October 9, 2002 || Anderson Mesa || LONEOS || — || align=right | 2.9 km || 
|-id=351 bgcolor=#E9E9E9
| 174351 ||  || — || October 7, 2002 || Socorro || LINEAR || — || align=right | 3.3 km || 
|-id=352 bgcolor=#E9E9E9
| 174352 ||  || — || October 9, 2002 || Socorro || LINEAR || HEN || align=right | 1.8 km || 
|-id=353 bgcolor=#E9E9E9
| 174353 ||  || — || October 9, 2002 || Socorro || LINEAR || — || align=right | 6.0 km || 
|-id=354 bgcolor=#E9E9E9
| 174354 ||  || — || October 9, 2002 || Socorro || LINEAR || PAE || align=right | 6.3 km || 
|-id=355 bgcolor=#E9E9E9
| 174355 ||  || — || October 9, 2002 || Socorro || LINEAR || — || align=right | 1.5 km || 
|-id=356 bgcolor=#E9E9E9
| 174356 ||  || — || October 10, 2002 || Socorro || LINEAR || MAR || align=right | 2.9 km || 
|-id=357 bgcolor=#E9E9E9
| 174357 ||  || — || October 10, 2002 || Socorro || LINEAR || GEF || align=right | 2.5 km || 
|-id=358 bgcolor=#E9E9E9
| 174358 ||  || — || October 10, 2002 || Socorro || LINEAR || — || align=right | 4.1 km || 
|-id=359 bgcolor=#d6d6d6
| 174359 ||  || — || October 10, 2002 || Socorro || LINEAR || BRA || align=right | 2.3 km || 
|-id=360 bgcolor=#E9E9E9
| 174360 ||  || — || October 13, 2002 || Palomar || NEAT || — || align=right | 2.9 km || 
|-id=361 bgcolor=#E9E9E9
| 174361 Rickwhite ||  ||  || October 4, 2002 || Apache Point || SDSS || — || align=right | 1.8 km || 
|-id=362 bgcolor=#E9E9E9
| 174362 Bethwillman ||  ||  || October 5, 2002 || Apache Point || SDSS || ADE || align=right | 4.3 km || 
|-id=363 bgcolor=#E9E9E9
| 174363 Donyork ||  ||  || October 5, 2002 || Apache Point || SDSS || GEF || align=right | 1.7 km || 
|-id=364 bgcolor=#E9E9E9
| 174364 Zakamska ||  ||  || October 10, 2002 || Apache Point || SDSS || — || align=right | 4.8 km || 
|-id=365 bgcolor=#E9E9E9
| 174365 Zibetti ||  ||  || October 10, 2002 || Apache Point || SDSS || — || align=right | 2.9 km || 
|-id=366 bgcolor=#E9E9E9
| 174366 ||  || — || October 12, 2002 || Socorro || LINEAR || — || align=right | 3.1 km || 
|-id=367 bgcolor=#E9E9E9
| 174367 ||  || — || October 28, 2002 || Palomar || NEAT || — || align=right | 1.9 km || 
|-id=368 bgcolor=#d6d6d6
| 174368 ||  || — || October 29, 2002 || Mount Hopkins || T. B. Spahr || EUP || align=right | 7.7 km || 
|-id=369 bgcolor=#E9E9E9
| 174369 ||  || — || October 29, 2002 || Kvistaberg || UDAS || — || align=right | 1.8 km || 
|-id=370 bgcolor=#E9E9E9
| 174370 ||  || — || October 30, 2002 || Haleakala || NEAT || — || align=right | 2.4 km || 
|-id=371 bgcolor=#E9E9E9
| 174371 ||  || — || October 30, 2002 || Haleakala || NEAT || EUN || align=right | 1.6 km || 
|-id=372 bgcolor=#E9E9E9
| 174372 ||  || — || October 31, 2002 || Anderson Mesa || LONEOS || — || align=right | 2.2 km || 
|-id=373 bgcolor=#E9E9E9
| 174373 ||  || — || October 31, 2002 || Kvistaberg || UDAS || — || align=right | 2.2 km || 
|-id=374 bgcolor=#E9E9E9
| 174374 ||  || — || October 31, 2002 || Palomar || NEAT || — || align=right | 1.6 km || 
|-id=375 bgcolor=#E9E9E9
| 174375 ||  || — || October 30, 2002 || Kitt Peak || Spacewatch || — || align=right | 2.8 km || 
|-id=376 bgcolor=#E9E9E9
| 174376 ||  || — || October 30, 2002 || Socorro || LINEAR || RAF || align=right | 1.5 km || 
|-id=377 bgcolor=#E9E9E9
| 174377 ||  || — || October 31, 2002 || Anderson Mesa || LONEOS || AGN || align=right | 1.8 km || 
|-id=378 bgcolor=#E9E9E9
| 174378 ||  || — || October 31, 2002 || Socorro || LINEAR || ADE || align=right | 2.7 km || 
|-id=379 bgcolor=#E9E9E9
| 174379 ||  || — || October 31, 2002 || Socorro || LINEAR || — || align=right | 3.8 km || 
|-id=380 bgcolor=#E9E9E9
| 174380 ||  || — || November 1, 2002 || Palomar || NEAT || HOF || align=right | 4.7 km || 
|-id=381 bgcolor=#E9E9E9
| 174381 ||  || — || November 4, 2002 || Palomar || NEAT || MIS || align=right | 3.8 km || 
|-id=382 bgcolor=#E9E9E9
| 174382 ||  || — || November 1, 2002 || Palomar || NEAT || — || align=right | 3.0 km || 
|-id=383 bgcolor=#E9E9E9
| 174383 ||  || — || November 1, 2002 || Palomar || NEAT || — || align=right | 2.1 km || 
|-id=384 bgcolor=#E9E9E9
| 174384 ||  || — || November 1, 2002 || Palomar || NEAT || MAR || align=right | 1.7 km || 
|-id=385 bgcolor=#E9E9E9
| 174385 ||  || — || November 1, 2002 || Palomar || NEAT || — || align=right | 2.5 km || 
|-id=386 bgcolor=#E9E9E9
| 174386 ||  || — || November 1, 2002 || Palomar || NEAT || — || align=right | 2.0 km || 
|-id=387 bgcolor=#E9E9E9
| 174387 ||  || — || November 4, 2002 || Anderson Mesa || LONEOS || — || align=right | 2.5 km || 
|-id=388 bgcolor=#E9E9E9
| 174388 ||  || — || November 4, 2002 || Palomar || NEAT || — || align=right | 2.2 km || 
|-id=389 bgcolor=#E9E9E9
| 174389 ||  || — || November 2, 2002 || Haleakala || NEAT || — || align=right | 1.9 km || 
|-id=390 bgcolor=#E9E9E9
| 174390 ||  || — || November 4, 2002 || Kitt Peak || Spacewatch || — || align=right | 2.7 km || 
|-id=391 bgcolor=#E9E9E9
| 174391 ||  || — || November 5, 2002 || Socorro || LINEAR || — || align=right | 3.2 km || 
|-id=392 bgcolor=#E9E9E9
| 174392 ||  || — || November 5, 2002 || Socorro || LINEAR || VIB || align=right | 2.8 km || 
|-id=393 bgcolor=#E9E9E9
| 174393 ||  || — || November 5, 2002 || Socorro || LINEAR || — || align=right | 2.7 km || 
|-id=394 bgcolor=#E9E9E9
| 174394 ||  || — || November 5, 2002 || Socorro || LINEAR || — || align=right | 4.4 km || 
|-id=395 bgcolor=#E9E9E9
| 174395 ||  || — || November 5, 2002 || Socorro || LINEAR || — || align=right | 2.1 km || 
|-id=396 bgcolor=#E9E9E9
| 174396 ||  || — || November 1, 2002 || Palomar || NEAT || — || align=right | 2.5 km || 
|-id=397 bgcolor=#E9E9E9
| 174397 ||  || — || November 5, 2002 || Anderson Mesa || LONEOS || ADE || align=right | 4.1 km || 
|-id=398 bgcolor=#E9E9E9
| 174398 ||  || — || November 6, 2002 || Anderson Mesa || LONEOS || — || align=right | 2.0 km || 
|-id=399 bgcolor=#E9E9E9
| 174399 ||  || — || November 6, 2002 || Socorro || LINEAR || — || align=right | 3.4 km || 
|-id=400 bgcolor=#E9E9E9
| 174400 ||  || — || November 6, 2002 || Haleakala || NEAT || — || align=right | 2.8 km || 
|}

174401–174500 

|-bgcolor=#E9E9E9
| 174401 ||  || — || November 5, 2002 || Socorro || LINEAR || — || align=right | 2.7 km || 
|-id=402 bgcolor=#E9E9E9
| 174402 ||  || — || November 7, 2002 || Socorro || LINEAR || — || align=right | 2.1 km || 
|-id=403 bgcolor=#E9E9E9
| 174403 ||  || — || November 7, 2002 || Socorro || LINEAR || — || align=right | 2.0 km || 
|-id=404 bgcolor=#E9E9E9
| 174404 ||  || — || November 7, 2002 || Socorro || LINEAR || — || align=right | 3.4 km || 
|-id=405 bgcolor=#E9E9E9
| 174405 ||  || — || November 7, 2002 || Socorro || LINEAR || — || align=right | 2.4 km || 
|-id=406 bgcolor=#E9E9E9
| 174406 ||  || — || November 7, 2002 || Socorro || LINEAR || — || align=right | 3.6 km || 
|-id=407 bgcolor=#E9E9E9
| 174407 ||  || — || November 7, 2002 || Socorro || LINEAR || — || align=right | 2.5 km || 
|-id=408 bgcolor=#E9E9E9
| 174408 ||  || — || November 7, 2002 || Socorro || LINEAR || NEM || align=right | 3.0 km || 
|-id=409 bgcolor=#E9E9E9
| 174409 ||  || — || November 7, 2002 || Socorro || LINEAR || — || align=right | 2.8 km || 
|-id=410 bgcolor=#E9E9E9
| 174410 ||  || — || November 7, 2002 || Socorro || LINEAR || — || align=right | 2.6 km || 
|-id=411 bgcolor=#E9E9E9
| 174411 ||  || — || November 8, 2002 || Socorro || LINEAR || — || align=right | 1.8 km || 
|-id=412 bgcolor=#E9E9E9
| 174412 ||  || — || November 11, 2002 || Socorro || LINEAR || — || align=right | 3.9 km || 
|-id=413 bgcolor=#E9E9E9
| 174413 ||  || — || November 12, 2002 || Socorro || LINEAR || — || align=right | 4.5 km || 
|-id=414 bgcolor=#E9E9E9
| 174414 ||  || — || November 13, 2002 || Socorro || LINEAR || — || align=right | 3.1 km || 
|-id=415 bgcolor=#E9E9E9
| 174415 ||  || — || November 13, 2002 || Palomar || NEAT || — || align=right | 2.9 km || 
|-id=416 bgcolor=#E9E9E9
| 174416 ||  || — || November 13, 2002 || Palomar || NEAT || — || align=right | 2.7 km || 
|-id=417 bgcolor=#E9E9E9
| 174417 ||  || — || November 13, 2002 || Palomar || NEAT || — || align=right | 4.2 km || 
|-id=418 bgcolor=#E9E9E9
| 174418 ||  || — || November 13, 2002 || Palomar || NEAT || GEF || align=right | 2.2 km || 
|-id=419 bgcolor=#E9E9E9
| 174419 ||  || — || November 6, 2002 || Haleakala || NEAT || — || align=right | 2.0 km || 
|-id=420 bgcolor=#E9E9E9
| 174420 ||  || — || November 14, 2002 || Socorro || LINEAR || — || align=right | 4.3 km || 
|-id=421 bgcolor=#E9E9E9
| 174421 ||  || — || November 23, 2002 || Palomar || NEAT || — || align=right | 2.4 km || 
|-id=422 bgcolor=#E9E9E9
| 174422 ||  || — || November 23, 2002 || Palomar || NEAT || HEN || align=right | 1.9 km || 
|-id=423 bgcolor=#E9E9E9
| 174423 ||  || — || November 24, 2002 || Palomar || NEAT || NEM || align=right | 3.3 km || 
|-id=424 bgcolor=#E9E9E9
| 174424 ||  || — || November 28, 2002 || Anderson Mesa || LONEOS || — || align=right | 3.0 km || 
|-id=425 bgcolor=#E9E9E9
| 174425 ||  || — || November 28, 2002 || Anderson Mesa || LONEOS || — || align=right | 2.2 km || 
|-id=426 bgcolor=#E9E9E9
| 174426 ||  || — || November 30, 2002 || Socorro || LINEAR || MAR || align=right | 1.8 km || 
|-id=427 bgcolor=#d6d6d6
| 174427 ||  || — || November 25, 2002 || Palomar || S. F. Hönig || KOR || align=right | 1.9 km || 
|-id=428 bgcolor=#d6d6d6
| 174428 || 2002 XS || — || December 1, 2002 || Socorro || LINEAR || CHA || align=right | 3.4 km || 
|-id=429 bgcolor=#d6d6d6
| 174429 ||  || — || December 2, 2002 || Socorro || LINEAR || — || align=right | 4.3 km || 
|-id=430 bgcolor=#E9E9E9
| 174430 ||  || — || December 3, 2002 || Palomar || NEAT || — || align=right | 2.7 km || 
|-id=431 bgcolor=#E9E9E9
| 174431 ||  || — || December 3, 2002 || Palomar || NEAT || — || align=right | 6.5 km || 
|-id=432 bgcolor=#d6d6d6
| 174432 ||  || — || December 3, 2002 || Haleakala || NEAT || 628 || align=right | 4.5 km || 
|-id=433 bgcolor=#E9E9E9
| 174433 ||  || — || December 3, 2002 || Palomar || NEAT || — || align=right | 4.8 km || 
|-id=434 bgcolor=#E9E9E9
| 174434 ||  || — || December 3, 2002 || Palomar || NEAT || — || align=right | 4.0 km || 
|-id=435 bgcolor=#E9E9E9
| 174435 ||  || — || December 5, 2002 || Socorro || LINEAR || — || align=right | 2.5 km || 
|-id=436 bgcolor=#E9E9E9
| 174436 ||  || — || December 6, 2002 || Socorro || LINEAR || — || align=right | 2.4 km || 
|-id=437 bgcolor=#E9E9E9
| 174437 ||  || — || December 6, 2002 || Socorro || LINEAR || — || align=right | 4.5 km || 
|-id=438 bgcolor=#d6d6d6
| 174438 ||  || — || December 6, 2002 || Socorro || LINEAR || — || align=right | 5.9 km || 
|-id=439 bgcolor=#E9E9E9
| 174439 ||  || — || December 7, 2002 || Desert Eagle || W. K. Y. Yeung || — || align=right | 2.0 km || 
|-id=440 bgcolor=#d6d6d6
| 174440 ||  || — || December 9, 2002 || Desert Eagle || W. K. Y. Yeung || ALA || align=right | 7.7 km || 
|-id=441 bgcolor=#E9E9E9
| 174441 ||  || — || December 7, 2002 || Socorro || LINEAR || PAL || align=right | 3.4 km || 
|-id=442 bgcolor=#E9E9E9
| 174442 ||  || — || December 9, 2002 || Desert Eagle || W. K. Y. Yeung || DOR || align=right | 4.5 km || 
|-id=443 bgcolor=#E9E9E9
| 174443 ||  || — || December 6, 2002 || Socorro || LINEAR || — || align=right | 1.5 km || 
|-id=444 bgcolor=#E9E9E9
| 174444 ||  || — || December 12, 2002 || Palomar || NEAT || GER || align=right | 3.0 km || 
|-id=445 bgcolor=#fefefe
| 174445 ||  || — || December 10, 2002 || Socorro || LINEAR || H || align=right | 1.2 km || 
|-id=446 bgcolor=#E9E9E9
| 174446 ||  || — || December 11, 2002 || Socorro || LINEAR || — || align=right | 3.5 km || 
|-id=447 bgcolor=#d6d6d6
| 174447 ||  || — || December 10, 2002 || Socorro || LINEAR || — || align=right | 4.0 km || 
|-id=448 bgcolor=#E9E9E9
| 174448 ||  || — || December 12, 2002 || Haleakala || NEAT || — || align=right | 4.8 km || 
|-id=449 bgcolor=#E9E9E9
| 174449 ||  || — || December 11, 2002 || Socorro || LINEAR || — || align=right | 3.3 km || 
|-id=450 bgcolor=#E9E9E9
| 174450 ||  || — || December 11, 2002 || Socorro || LINEAR || GEF || align=right | 2.1 km || 
|-id=451 bgcolor=#E9E9E9
| 174451 ||  || — || December 11, 2002 || Socorro || LINEAR || — || align=right | 4.6 km || 
|-id=452 bgcolor=#d6d6d6
| 174452 ||  || — || December 11, 2002 || Socorro || LINEAR || — || align=right | 5.6 km || 
|-id=453 bgcolor=#d6d6d6
| 174453 ||  || — || December 11, 2002 || Socorro || LINEAR || IMH || align=right | 5.8 km || 
|-id=454 bgcolor=#d6d6d6
| 174454 ||  || — || December 11, 2002 || Socorro || LINEAR || — || align=right | 5.1 km || 
|-id=455 bgcolor=#d6d6d6
| 174455 ||  || — || December 13, 2002 || Anderson Mesa || LONEOS || — || align=right | 3.8 km || 
|-id=456 bgcolor=#d6d6d6
| 174456 ||  || — || December 12, 2002 || Palomar || NEAT || — || align=right | 5.7 km || 
|-id=457 bgcolor=#E9E9E9
| 174457 ||  || — || December 6, 2002 || Socorro || LINEAR || — || align=right | 2.6 km || 
|-id=458 bgcolor=#E9E9E9
| 174458 ||  || — || December 6, 2002 || Socorro || LINEAR || MRX || align=right | 1.9 km || 
|-id=459 bgcolor=#E9E9E9
| 174459 ||  || — || December 29, 2002 || Socorro || LINEAR || — || align=right | 4.4 km || 
|-id=460 bgcolor=#d6d6d6
| 174460 ||  || — || December 31, 2002 || Socorro || LINEAR || — || align=right | 4.0 km || 
|-id=461 bgcolor=#fefefe
| 174461 ||  || — || December 31, 2002 || Socorro || LINEAR || H || align=right | 1.1 km || 
|-id=462 bgcolor=#E9E9E9
| 174462 ||  || — || December 31, 2002 || Socorro || LINEAR || GEF || align=right | 2.1 km || 
|-id=463 bgcolor=#E9E9E9
| 174463 ||  || — || December 31, 2002 || Socorro || LINEAR || — || align=right | 4.5 km || 
|-id=464 bgcolor=#E9E9E9
| 174464 ||  || — || December 31, 2002 || Socorro || LINEAR || — || align=right | 2.5 km || 
|-id=465 bgcolor=#E9E9E9
| 174465 ||  || — || December 27, 2002 || Palomar || NEAT || — || align=right | 8.0 km || 
|-id=466 bgcolor=#d6d6d6
| 174466 Zucker ||  ||  || December 31, 2002 || Apache Point || SDSS || — || align=right | 5.4 km || 
|-id=467 bgcolor=#d6d6d6
| 174467 ||  || — || December 31, 2002 || Socorro || LINEAR || — || align=right | 3.8 km || 
|-id=468 bgcolor=#d6d6d6
| 174468 ||  || — || January 1, 2003 || Socorro || LINEAR || — || align=right | 6.5 km || 
|-id=469 bgcolor=#d6d6d6
| 174469 ||  || — || January 1, 2003 || Kitt Peak || Spacewatch || — || align=right | 4.9 km || 
|-id=470 bgcolor=#fefefe
| 174470 ||  || — || January 2, 2003 || Socorro || LINEAR || H || align=right | 1.6 km || 
|-id=471 bgcolor=#E9E9E9
| 174471 ||  || — || January 1, 2003 || Socorro || LINEAR || GEF || align=right | 2.1 km || 
|-id=472 bgcolor=#d6d6d6
| 174472 ||  || — || January 1, 2003 || Socorro || LINEAR || EUP || align=right | 7.9 km || 
|-id=473 bgcolor=#d6d6d6
| 174473 ||  || — || January 6, 2003 || Needville || Needville Obs. || HYG || align=right | 3.3 km || 
|-id=474 bgcolor=#E9E9E9
| 174474 ||  || — || January 5, 2003 || Anderson Mesa || LONEOS || — || align=right | 5.4 km || 
|-id=475 bgcolor=#E9E9E9
| 174475 ||  || — || January 5, 2003 || Socorro || LINEAR || — || align=right | 3.4 km || 
|-id=476 bgcolor=#E9E9E9
| 174476 ||  || — || January 5, 2003 || Socorro || LINEAR || — || align=right | 4.9 km || 
|-id=477 bgcolor=#E9E9E9
| 174477 ||  || — || January 4, 2003 || Socorro || LINEAR || — || align=right | 3.2 km || 
|-id=478 bgcolor=#d6d6d6
| 174478 ||  || — || January 4, 2003 || Socorro || LINEAR || — || align=right | 3.1 km || 
|-id=479 bgcolor=#d6d6d6
| 174479 ||  || — || January 7, 2003 || Socorro || LINEAR || NAE || align=right | 6.1 km || 
|-id=480 bgcolor=#d6d6d6
| 174480 ||  || — || January 7, 2003 || Socorro || LINEAR || — || align=right | 5.5 km || 
|-id=481 bgcolor=#d6d6d6
| 174481 ||  || — || January 5, 2003 || Socorro || LINEAR || — || align=right | 4.9 km || 
|-id=482 bgcolor=#d6d6d6
| 174482 ||  || — || January 5, 2003 || Socorro || LINEAR || — || align=right | 5.6 km || 
|-id=483 bgcolor=#d6d6d6
| 174483 ||  || — || January 5, 2003 || Socorro || LINEAR || — || align=right | 5.1 km || 
|-id=484 bgcolor=#d6d6d6
| 174484 ||  || — || January 8, 2003 || Socorro || LINEAR || SAN || align=right | 2.3 km || 
|-id=485 bgcolor=#E9E9E9
| 174485 ||  || — || January 9, 2003 || Socorro || LINEAR || — || align=right | 4.2 km || 
|-id=486 bgcolor=#d6d6d6
| 174486 ||  || — || January 10, 2003 || Socorro || LINEAR || — || align=right | 4.6 km || 
|-id=487 bgcolor=#d6d6d6
| 174487 ||  || — || January 10, 2003 || Socorro || LINEAR || EOS || align=right | 3.2 km || 
|-id=488 bgcolor=#d6d6d6
| 174488 ||  || — || January 23, 2003 || Kitt Peak || Spacewatch || TIR || align=right | 3.6 km || 
|-id=489 bgcolor=#d6d6d6
| 174489 ||  || — || January 26, 2003 || Anderson Mesa || LONEOS || — || align=right | 4.5 km || 
|-id=490 bgcolor=#d6d6d6
| 174490 ||  || — || January 26, 2003 || Anderson Mesa || LONEOS || — || align=right | 7.6 km || 
|-id=491 bgcolor=#d6d6d6
| 174491 ||  || — || January 26, 2003 || Anderson Mesa || LONEOS || — || align=right | 5.8 km || 
|-id=492 bgcolor=#d6d6d6
| 174492 ||  || — || January 26, 2003 || Haleakala || NEAT || — || align=right | 5.0 km || 
|-id=493 bgcolor=#d6d6d6
| 174493 ||  || — || January 26, 2003 || Anderson Mesa || LONEOS || — || align=right | 6.4 km || 
|-id=494 bgcolor=#d6d6d6
| 174494 ||  || — || January 26, 2003 || Haleakala || NEAT || — || align=right | 6.2 km || 
|-id=495 bgcolor=#d6d6d6
| 174495 ||  || — || January 26, 2003 || Haleakala || NEAT || — || align=right | 5.1 km || 
|-id=496 bgcolor=#d6d6d6
| 174496 ||  || — || January 26, 2003 || Haleakala || NEAT || — || align=right | 6.2 km || 
|-id=497 bgcolor=#E9E9E9
| 174497 ||  || — || January 25, 2003 || Palomar || NEAT || — || align=right | 4.6 km || 
|-id=498 bgcolor=#d6d6d6
| 174498 ||  || — || January 27, 2003 || Anderson Mesa || LONEOS || — || align=right | 3.8 km || 
|-id=499 bgcolor=#d6d6d6
| 174499 ||  || — || January 27, 2003 || Socorro || LINEAR || — || align=right | 7.0 km || 
|-id=500 bgcolor=#d6d6d6
| 174500 ||  || — || January 28, 2003 || Socorro || LINEAR || — || align=right | 5.2 km || 
|}

174501–174600 

|-bgcolor=#d6d6d6
| 174501 ||  || — || January 28, 2003 || Palomar || NEAT || EOS || align=right | 3.3 km || 
|-id=502 bgcolor=#d6d6d6
| 174502 ||  || — || January 27, 2003 || Socorro || LINEAR || — || align=right | 5.6 km || 
|-id=503 bgcolor=#d6d6d6
| 174503 ||  || — || January 27, 2003 || Socorro || LINEAR || — || align=right | 4.4 km || 
|-id=504 bgcolor=#d6d6d6
| 174504 ||  || — || January 27, 2003 || Haleakala || NEAT || — || align=right | 5.2 km || 
|-id=505 bgcolor=#d6d6d6
| 174505 ||  || — || January 28, 2003 || Socorro || LINEAR || — || align=right | 4.6 km || 
|-id=506 bgcolor=#d6d6d6
| 174506 ||  || — || January 27, 2003 || Socorro || LINEAR || EOS || align=right | 2.8 km || 
|-id=507 bgcolor=#d6d6d6
| 174507 ||  || — || January 28, 2003 || Kitt Peak || Spacewatch || — || align=right | 4.8 km || 
|-id=508 bgcolor=#d6d6d6
| 174508 ||  || — || January 28, 2003 || Palomar || NEAT || — || align=right | 3.5 km || 
|-id=509 bgcolor=#d6d6d6
| 174509 ||  || — || January 30, 2003 || Anderson Mesa || LONEOS || THM || align=right | 3.7 km || 
|-id=510 bgcolor=#d6d6d6
| 174510 ||  || — || January 28, 2003 || Kitt Peak || Spacewatch || — || align=right | 3.8 km || 
|-id=511 bgcolor=#d6d6d6
| 174511 ||  || — || January 30, 2003 || Anderson Mesa || LONEOS || TIR || align=right | 4.1 km || 
|-id=512 bgcolor=#d6d6d6
| 174512 ||  || — || January 30, 2003 || Haleakala || NEAT || EOS || align=right | 3.6 km || 
|-id=513 bgcolor=#d6d6d6
| 174513 ||  || — || January 31, 2003 || Socorro || LINEAR || — || align=right | 4.9 km || 
|-id=514 bgcolor=#d6d6d6
| 174514 ||  || — || January 26, 2003 || Anderson Mesa || LONEOS || — || align=right | 6.4 km || 
|-id=515 bgcolor=#d6d6d6
| 174515 Pamelaivezic ||  ||  || January 28, 2003 || Apache Point || SDSS || — || align=right | 3.9 km || 
|-id=516 bgcolor=#d6d6d6
| 174516 ||  || — || February 1, 2003 || Socorro || LINEAR || — || align=right | 4.5 km || 
|-id=517 bgcolor=#d6d6d6
| 174517 ||  || — || February 1, 2003 || Socorro || LINEAR || — || align=right | 4.2 km || 
|-id=518 bgcolor=#d6d6d6
| 174518 ||  || — || February 8, 2003 || Socorro || LINEAR || — || align=right | 4.0 km || 
|-id=519 bgcolor=#d6d6d6
| 174519 ||  || — || February 9, 2003 || Kitt Peak || Spacewatch || — || align=right | 4.0 km || 
|-id=520 bgcolor=#d6d6d6
| 174520 ||  || — || February 22, 2003 || Palomar || NEAT || URS || align=right | 4.8 km || 
|-id=521 bgcolor=#d6d6d6
| 174521 ||  || — || February 24, 2003 || Haleakala || NEAT || — || align=right | 5.2 km || 
|-id=522 bgcolor=#d6d6d6
| 174522 ||  || — || February 22, 2003 || Anderson Mesa || LONEOS || — || align=right | 3.6 km || 
|-id=523 bgcolor=#d6d6d6
| 174523 ||  || — || February 22, 2003 || Anderson Mesa || LONEOS || — || align=right | 5.7 km || 
|-id=524 bgcolor=#d6d6d6
| 174524 ||  || — || February 22, 2003 || Palomar || NEAT || EOS || align=right | 4.7 km || 
|-id=525 bgcolor=#d6d6d6
| 174525 ||  || — || February 22, 2003 || Palomar || NEAT || — || align=right | 5.6 km || 
|-id=526 bgcolor=#d6d6d6
| 174526 ||  || — || February 22, 2003 || Palomar || NEAT || — || align=right | 4.6 km || 
|-id=527 bgcolor=#d6d6d6
| 174527 ||  || — || March 6, 2003 || Anderson Mesa || LONEOS || — || align=right | 6.5 km || 
|-id=528 bgcolor=#d6d6d6
| 174528 ||  || — || March 7, 2003 || Socorro || LINEAR || — || align=right | 5.1 km || 
|-id=529 bgcolor=#d6d6d6
| 174529 ||  || — || March 6, 2003 || Anderson Mesa || LONEOS || — || align=right | 6.0 km || 
|-id=530 bgcolor=#d6d6d6
| 174530 ||  || — || March 6, 2003 || Anderson Mesa || LONEOS || — || align=right | 3.9 km || 
|-id=531 bgcolor=#d6d6d6
| 174531 ||  || — || March 6, 2003 || Socorro || LINEAR || — || align=right | 6.3 km || 
|-id=532 bgcolor=#d6d6d6
| 174532 ||  || — || March 6, 2003 || Socorro || LINEAR || HYG || align=right | 5.4 km || 
|-id=533 bgcolor=#d6d6d6
| 174533 ||  || — || March 6, 2003 || Socorro || LINEAR || — || align=right | 6.9 km || 
|-id=534 bgcolor=#d6d6d6
| 174534 ||  || — || March 7, 2003 || Anderson Mesa || LONEOS || VER || align=right | 5.5 km || 
|-id=535 bgcolor=#d6d6d6
| 174535 ||  || — || March 8, 2003 || Anderson Mesa || LONEOS || — || align=right | 5.1 km || 
|-id=536 bgcolor=#d6d6d6
| 174536 ||  || — || March 8, 2003 || Palomar || NEAT || ALA || align=right | 4.4 km || 
|-id=537 bgcolor=#d6d6d6
| 174537 ||  || — || March 6, 2003 || Socorro || LINEAR || — || align=right | 4.7 km || 
|-id=538 bgcolor=#d6d6d6
| 174538 ||  || — || March 8, 2003 || Socorro || LINEAR || — || align=right | 5.8 km || 
|-id=539 bgcolor=#d6d6d6
| 174539 ||  || — || March 9, 2003 || Anderson Mesa || LONEOS || — || align=right | 4.5 km || 
|-id=540 bgcolor=#d6d6d6
| 174540 ||  || — || March 12, 2003 || Socorro || LINEAR || — || align=right | 4.3 km || 
|-id=541 bgcolor=#d6d6d6
| 174541 ||  || — || March 7, 2003 || Socorro || LINEAR || EOS || align=right | 3.2 km || 
|-id=542 bgcolor=#d6d6d6
| 174542 || 2003 FE || — || March 22, 2003 || Palomar || NEAT || — || align=right | 10 km || 
|-id=543 bgcolor=#d6d6d6
| 174543 ||  || — || March 23, 2003 || Kitt Peak || Spacewatch || — || align=right | 3.3 km || 
|-id=544 bgcolor=#d6d6d6
| 174544 ||  || — || March 24, 2003 || Kitt Peak || Spacewatch || — || align=right | 4.0 km || 
|-id=545 bgcolor=#d6d6d6
| 174545 ||  || — || March 25, 2003 || Palomar || NEAT || THM || align=right | 3.8 km || 
|-id=546 bgcolor=#d6d6d6
| 174546 ||  || — || March 26, 2003 || Palomar || NEAT || — || align=right | 4.7 km || 
|-id=547 bgcolor=#d6d6d6
| 174547 ||  || — || March 26, 2003 || Palomar || NEAT || HYG || align=right | 4.5 km || 
|-id=548 bgcolor=#d6d6d6
| 174548 ||  || — || March 26, 2003 || Palomar || NEAT || — || align=right | 5.0 km || 
|-id=549 bgcolor=#d6d6d6
| 174549 ||  || — || March 26, 2003 || Palomar || NEAT || EOS || align=right | 3.1 km || 
|-id=550 bgcolor=#d6d6d6
| 174550 ||  || — || March 26, 2003 || Kitt Peak || Spacewatch || — || align=right | 4.0 km || 
|-id=551 bgcolor=#d6d6d6
| 174551 ||  || — || March 27, 2003 || Campo Imperatore || CINEOS || — || align=right | 6.3 km || 
|-id=552 bgcolor=#d6d6d6
| 174552 ||  || — || March 27, 2003 || Kitt Peak || Spacewatch || EUP || align=right | 9.0 km || 
|-id=553 bgcolor=#d6d6d6
| 174553 ||  || — || March 28, 2003 || Anderson Mesa || LONEOS || — || align=right | 5.4 km || 
|-id=554 bgcolor=#d6d6d6
| 174554 ||  || — || March 28, 2003 || Catalina || CSS || — || align=right | 4.7 km || 
|-id=555 bgcolor=#d6d6d6
| 174555 ||  || — || March 29, 2003 || Anderson Mesa || LONEOS || — || align=right | 4.3 km || 
|-id=556 bgcolor=#d6d6d6
| 174556 ||  || — || March 30, 2003 || Anderson Mesa || LONEOS || — || align=right | 4.9 km || 
|-id=557 bgcolor=#d6d6d6
| 174557 ||  || — || March 30, 2003 || Socorro || LINEAR || — || align=right | 4.5 km || 
|-id=558 bgcolor=#d6d6d6
| 174558 ||  || — || March 30, 2003 || Socorro || LINEAR || HYG || align=right | 5.0 km || 
|-id=559 bgcolor=#d6d6d6
| 174559 ||  || — || March 31, 2003 || Anderson Mesa || LONEOS || — || align=right | 4.7 km || 
|-id=560 bgcolor=#d6d6d6
| 174560 ||  || — || March 31, 2003 || Socorro || LINEAR || — || align=right | 5.4 km || 
|-id=561 bgcolor=#d6d6d6
| 174561 ||  || — || March 27, 2003 || Palomar || NEAT || — || align=right | 5.8 km || 
|-id=562 bgcolor=#d6d6d6
| 174562 ||  || — || April 1, 2003 || Socorro || LINEAR || — || align=right | 4.5 km || 
|-id=563 bgcolor=#d6d6d6
| 174563 ||  || — || April 1, 2003 || Socorro || LINEAR || — || align=right | 7.8 km || 
|-id=564 bgcolor=#d6d6d6
| 174564 ||  || — || April 2, 2003 || Haleakala || NEAT || — || align=right | 4.3 km || 
|-id=565 bgcolor=#d6d6d6
| 174565 || 2003 HC || — || April 20, 2003 || Haleakala || NEAT || LIX || align=right | 6.4 km || 
|-id=566 bgcolor=#fefefe
| 174566 ||  || — || May 28, 2003 || Haleakala || NEAT || — || align=right | 1.5 km || 
|-id=567 bgcolor=#C2E0FF
| 174567 Varda ||  ||  || June 21, 2003 || Kitt Peak || J. A. Larsen || other TNOmoon || align=right | 926 km || 
|-id=568 bgcolor=#fefefe
| 174568 ||  || — || July 5, 2003 || Kitt Peak || Spacewatch || NYS || align=right data-sort-value="0.88" | 880 m || 
|-id=569 bgcolor=#fefefe
| 174569 ||  || — || July 5, 2003 || Kitt Peak || Spacewatch || — || align=right data-sort-value="0.94" | 940 m || 
|-id=570 bgcolor=#fefefe
| 174570 ||  || — || July 18, 2003 || Haleakala || NEAT || — || align=right | 2.7 km || 
|-id=571 bgcolor=#fefefe
| 174571 ||  || — || July 28, 2003 || Palomar || NEAT || — || align=right | 1.4 km || 
|-id=572 bgcolor=#fefefe
| 174572 ||  || — || July 29, 2003 || Socorro || LINEAR || — || align=right | 1.6 km || 
|-id=573 bgcolor=#fefefe
| 174573 ||  || — || July 30, 2003 || Socorro || LINEAR || — || align=right | 1.7 km || 
|-id=574 bgcolor=#fefefe
| 174574 ||  || — || July 30, 2003 || Socorro || LINEAR || — || align=right | 2.0 km || 
|-id=575 bgcolor=#fefefe
| 174575 ||  || — || July 24, 2003 || Palomar || NEAT || FLO || align=right | 1.0 km || 
|-id=576 bgcolor=#fefefe
| 174576 ||  || — || July 24, 2003 || Palomar || NEAT || — || align=right | 1.3 km || 
|-id=577 bgcolor=#fefefe
| 174577 ||  || — || July 30, 2003 || Socorro || LINEAR || — || align=right | 1.3 km || 
|-id=578 bgcolor=#fefefe
| 174578 ||  || — || August 1, 2003 || Socorro || LINEAR || — || align=right | 1.4 km || 
|-id=579 bgcolor=#fefefe
| 174579 ||  || — || August 22, 2003 || Palomar || NEAT || FLO || align=right data-sort-value="0.95" | 950 m || 
|-id=580 bgcolor=#fefefe
| 174580 ||  || — || August 22, 2003 || Palomar || NEAT || — || align=right | 1.3 km || 
|-id=581 bgcolor=#fefefe
| 174581 ||  || — || August 20, 2003 || Palomar || NEAT || ERI || align=right | 2.9 km || 
|-id=582 bgcolor=#fefefe
| 174582 ||  || — || August 22, 2003 || Palomar || NEAT || — || align=right | 2.6 km || 
|-id=583 bgcolor=#fefefe
| 174583 ||  || — || August 22, 2003 || Palomar || NEAT || — || align=right | 1.1 km || 
|-id=584 bgcolor=#fefefe
| 174584 ||  || — || August 22, 2003 || Palomar || NEAT || — || align=right | 1.4 km || 
|-id=585 bgcolor=#fefefe
| 174585 ||  || — || August 22, 2003 || Palomar || NEAT || NYS || align=right | 1.1 km || 
|-id=586 bgcolor=#fefefe
| 174586 ||  || — || August 22, 2003 || Socorro || LINEAR || — || align=right | 1.0 km || 
|-id=587 bgcolor=#fefefe
| 174587 ||  || — || August 22, 2003 || Socorro || LINEAR || NYS || align=right | 1.2 km || 
|-id=588 bgcolor=#fefefe
| 174588 ||  || — || August 22, 2003 || Socorro || LINEAR || — || align=right | 1.4 km || 
|-id=589 bgcolor=#fefefe
| 174589 ||  || — || August 23, 2003 || Socorro || LINEAR || NYS || align=right | 1.1 km || 
|-id=590 bgcolor=#fefefe
| 174590 ||  || — || August 23, 2003 || Palomar || NEAT || — || align=right | 1.2 km || 
|-id=591 bgcolor=#fefefe
| 174591 ||  || — || August 23, 2003 || Socorro || LINEAR || — || align=right | 1.2 km || 
|-id=592 bgcolor=#fefefe
| 174592 ||  || — || August 23, 2003 || Socorro || LINEAR || — || align=right | 1.1 km || 
|-id=593 bgcolor=#fefefe
| 174593 ||  || — || August 23, 2003 || Socorro || LINEAR || FLO || align=right | 1.0 km || 
|-id=594 bgcolor=#fefefe
| 174594 ||  || — || August 23, 2003 || Socorro || LINEAR || ERI || align=right | 3.0 km || 
|-id=595 bgcolor=#fefefe
| 174595 ||  || — || August 23, 2003 || Socorro || LINEAR || FLO || align=right | 1.1 km || 
|-id=596 bgcolor=#fefefe
| 174596 ||  || — || August 23, 2003 || Palomar || NEAT || — || align=right | 1.3 km || 
|-id=597 bgcolor=#fefefe
| 174597 ||  || — || August 23, 2003 || Socorro || LINEAR || FLO || align=right data-sort-value="0.87" | 870 m || 
|-id=598 bgcolor=#fefefe
| 174598 ||  || — || August 24, 2003 || Socorro || LINEAR || V || align=right | 1.0 km || 
|-id=599 bgcolor=#FA8072
| 174599 ||  || — || August 21, 2003 || Socorro || LINEAR || — || align=right | 2.5 km || 
|-id=600 bgcolor=#fefefe
| 174600 ||  || — || August 24, 2003 || Socorro || LINEAR || FLO || align=right data-sort-value="0.91" | 910 m || 
|}

174601–174700 

|-bgcolor=#fefefe
| 174601 ||  || — || August 24, 2003 || Socorro || LINEAR || FLO || align=right | 1.9 km || 
|-id=602 bgcolor=#E9E9E9
| 174602 ||  || — || August 31, 2003 || Socorro || LINEAR || — || align=right | 1.5 km || 
|-id=603 bgcolor=#fefefe
| 174603 ||  || — || August 31, 2003 || Socorro || LINEAR || PHO || align=right | 3.9 km || 
|-id=604 bgcolor=#fefefe
| 174604 ||  || — || August 31, 2003 || Socorro || LINEAR || — || align=right | 1.2 km || 
|-id=605 bgcolor=#fefefe
| 174605 ||  || — || September 3, 2003 || Haleakala || NEAT || — || align=right | 1.8 km || 
|-id=606 bgcolor=#fefefe
| 174606 ||  || — || September 13, 2003 || Haleakala || NEAT || V || align=right | 1.2 km || 
|-id=607 bgcolor=#fefefe
| 174607 ||  || — || September 3, 2003 || Socorro || LINEAR || FLO || align=right | 1.7 km || 
|-id=608 bgcolor=#fefefe
| 174608 ||  || — || September 16, 2003 || Palomar || NEAT || NYS || align=right | 1.2 km || 
|-id=609 bgcolor=#fefefe
| 174609 ||  || — || September 17, 2003 || Haleakala || NEAT || — || align=right | 1.2 km || 
|-id=610 bgcolor=#fefefe
| 174610 ||  || — || September 18, 2003 || Socorro || LINEAR || V || align=right | 1.5 km || 
|-id=611 bgcolor=#fefefe
| 174611 ||  || — || September 19, 2003 || Desert Eagle || W. K. Y. Yeung || — || align=right | 1.1 km || 
|-id=612 bgcolor=#fefefe
| 174612 ||  || — || September 16, 2003 || Palomar || NEAT || — || align=right | 1.2 km || 
|-id=613 bgcolor=#fefefe
| 174613 ||  || — || September 17, 2003 || Palomar || NEAT || — || align=right | 3.9 km || 
|-id=614 bgcolor=#fefefe
| 174614 ||  || — || September 16, 2003 || Anderson Mesa || LONEOS || — || align=right data-sort-value="0.91" | 910 m || 
|-id=615 bgcolor=#fefefe
| 174615 ||  || — || September 16, 2003 || Anderson Mesa || LONEOS || V || align=right | 1.2 km || 
|-id=616 bgcolor=#fefefe
| 174616 ||  || — || September 18, 2003 || Palomar || NEAT || — || align=right | 1.2 km || 
|-id=617 bgcolor=#fefefe
| 174617 ||  || — || September 18, 2003 || Palomar || NEAT || MAS || align=right | 1.3 km || 
|-id=618 bgcolor=#fefefe
| 174618 ||  || — || September 18, 2003 || Palomar || NEAT || — || align=right | 1.2 km || 
|-id=619 bgcolor=#fefefe
| 174619 ||  || — || September 18, 2003 || Campo Imperatore || CINEOS || FLO || align=right | 1.8 km || 
|-id=620 bgcolor=#fefefe
| 174620 ||  || — || September 18, 2003 || Socorro || LINEAR || — || align=right | 1.5 km || 
|-id=621 bgcolor=#fefefe
| 174621 ||  || — || September 19, 2003 || Campo Imperatore || CINEOS || — || align=right | 1.7 km || 
|-id=622 bgcolor=#fefefe
| 174622 ||  || — || September 19, 2003 || Socorro || LINEAR || FLO || align=right | 1.4 km || 
|-id=623 bgcolor=#fefefe
| 174623 ||  || — || September 18, 2003 || Kitt Peak || Spacewatch || — || align=right | 1.1 km || 
|-id=624 bgcolor=#fefefe
| 174624 ||  || — || September 18, 2003 || Kitt Peak || Spacewatch || — || align=right | 1.1 km || 
|-id=625 bgcolor=#fefefe
| 174625 ||  || — || September 19, 2003 || Uccle || Uccle Obs. || NYS || align=right | 2.0 km || 
|-id=626 bgcolor=#fefefe
| 174626 ||  || — || September 19, 2003 || Kitt Peak || Spacewatch || V || align=right | 1.2 km || 
|-id=627 bgcolor=#fefefe
| 174627 ||  || — || September 19, 2003 || Kitt Peak || Spacewatch || — || align=right | 1.0 km || 
|-id=628 bgcolor=#fefefe
| 174628 ||  || — || September 18, 2003 || Palomar || NEAT || V || align=right | 1.1 km || 
|-id=629 bgcolor=#fefefe
| 174629 ||  || — || September 18, 2003 || Kitt Peak || Spacewatch || — || align=right | 1.2 km || 
|-id=630 bgcolor=#fefefe
| 174630 ||  || — || September 18, 2003 || Kitt Peak || Spacewatch || FLO || align=right | 1.2 km || 
|-id=631 bgcolor=#fefefe
| 174631 ||  || — || September 20, 2003 || Palomar || NEAT || — || align=right | 1.2 km || 
|-id=632 bgcolor=#fefefe
| 174632 ||  || — || September 20, 2003 || Palomar || NEAT || — || align=right | 1.3 km || 
|-id=633 bgcolor=#fefefe
| 174633 ||  || — || September 20, 2003 || Palomar || NEAT || ERI || align=right | 2.7 km || 
|-id=634 bgcolor=#fefefe
| 174634 ||  || — || September 20, 2003 || Haleakala || NEAT || — || align=right | 1.6 km || 
|-id=635 bgcolor=#fefefe
| 174635 ||  || — || September 19, 2003 || Campo Imperatore || CINEOS || V || align=right | 1.0 km || 
|-id=636 bgcolor=#fefefe
| 174636 ||  || — || September 19, 2003 || Socorro || LINEAR || MAS || align=right | 1.1 km || 
|-id=637 bgcolor=#fefefe
| 174637 ||  || — || September 20, 2003 || Palomar || NEAT || — || align=right | 1.3 km || 
|-id=638 bgcolor=#fefefe
| 174638 ||  || — || September 19, 2003 || Socorro || LINEAR || KLI || align=right | 3.6 km || 
|-id=639 bgcolor=#fefefe
| 174639 ||  || — || September 21, 2003 || Socorro || LINEAR || — || align=right | 1.1 km || 
|-id=640 bgcolor=#fefefe
| 174640 ||  || — || September 19, 2003 || Kitt Peak || Spacewatch || NYS || align=right data-sort-value="0.80" | 800 m || 
|-id=641 bgcolor=#E9E9E9
| 174641 ||  || — || September 20, 2003 || Campo Imperatore || CINEOS || GEF || align=right | 2.3 km || 
|-id=642 bgcolor=#fefefe
| 174642 ||  || — || September 20, 2003 || Socorro || LINEAR || NYS || align=right | 1.4 km || 
|-id=643 bgcolor=#fefefe
| 174643 ||  || — || September 19, 2003 || Haleakala || NEAT || — || align=right | 1.8 km || 
|-id=644 bgcolor=#fefefe
| 174644 ||  || — || September 19, 2003 || Anderson Mesa || LONEOS || NYS || align=right | 1.1 km || 
|-id=645 bgcolor=#fefefe
| 174645 ||  || — || September 18, 2003 || Socorro || LINEAR || NYS || align=right | 1.2 km || 
|-id=646 bgcolor=#fefefe
| 174646 ||  || — || September 20, 2003 || Anderson Mesa || LONEOS || MAS || align=right | 1.0 km || 
|-id=647 bgcolor=#E9E9E9
| 174647 ||  || — || September 23, 2003 || Haleakala || NEAT || — || align=right | 1.9 km || 
|-id=648 bgcolor=#E9E9E9
| 174648 ||  || — || September 23, 2003 || Haleakala || NEAT || HNS || align=right | 2.5 km || 
|-id=649 bgcolor=#fefefe
| 174649 ||  || — || September 18, 2003 || Socorro || LINEAR || NYS || align=right data-sort-value="0.85" | 850 m || 
|-id=650 bgcolor=#fefefe
| 174650 ||  || — || September 20, 2003 || Socorro || LINEAR || — || align=right | 1.1 km || 
|-id=651 bgcolor=#fefefe
| 174651 ||  || — || September 22, 2003 || Palomar || NEAT || NYS || align=right | 1.1 km || 
|-id=652 bgcolor=#fefefe
| 174652 ||  || — || September 24, 2003 || Haleakala || NEAT || V || align=right | 1.3 km || 
|-id=653 bgcolor=#fefefe
| 174653 ||  || — || September 18, 2003 || Palomar || NEAT || — || align=right | 1.4 km || 
|-id=654 bgcolor=#fefefe
| 174654 ||  || — || September 20, 2003 || Campo Imperatore || CINEOS || — || align=right | 1.5 km || 
|-id=655 bgcolor=#fefefe
| 174655 ||  || — || September 20, 2003 || Haleakala || NEAT || V || align=right | 1.3 km || 
|-id=656 bgcolor=#fefefe
| 174656 ||  || — || September 20, 2003 || Palomar || NEAT || FLO || align=right | 1.0 km || 
|-id=657 bgcolor=#fefefe
| 174657 ||  || — || September 21, 2003 || Anderson Mesa || LONEOS || — || align=right | 1.7 km || 
|-id=658 bgcolor=#fefefe
| 174658 ||  || — || September 22, 2003 || Socorro || LINEAR || — || align=right | 1.7 km || 
|-id=659 bgcolor=#fefefe
| 174659 ||  || — || September 26, 2003 || Socorro || LINEAR || — || align=right | 3.3 km || 
|-id=660 bgcolor=#fefefe
| 174660 ||  || — || September 25, 2003 || Haleakala || NEAT || FLO || align=right | 2.2 km || 
|-id=661 bgcolor=#fefefe
| 174661 ||  || — || September 26, 2003 || Socorro || LINEAR || FLO || align=right data-sort-value="0.89" | 890 m || 
|-id=662 bgcolor=#fefefe
| 174662 ||  || — || September 26, 2003 || Desert Eagle || W. K. Y. Yeung || NYS || align=right data-sort-value="0.91" | 910 m || 
|-id=663 bgcolor=#fefefe
| 174663 ||  || — || September 27, 2003 || Desert Eagle || W. K. Y. Yeung || ERI || align=right | 3.0 km || 
|-id=664 bgcolor=#fefefe
| 174664 ||  || — || September 29, 2003 || Desert Eagle || W. K. Y. Yeung || MAS || align=right | 1.2 km || 
|-id=665 bgcolor=#fefefe
| 174665 ||  || — || September 25, 2003 || Haleakala || NEAT || — || align=right | 1.4 km || 
|-id=666 bgcolor=#fefefe
| 174666 ||  || — || September 24, 2003 || Palomar || NEAT || V || align=right data-sort-value="0.91" | 910 m || 
|-id=667 bgcolor=#fefefe
| 174667 ||  || — || September 24, 2003 || Haleakala || NEAT || MAS || align=right | 1.3 km || 
|-id=668 bgcolor=#fefefe
| 174668 ||  || — || September 25, 2003 || Palomar || NEAT || NYS || align=right | 1.1 km || 
|-id=669 bgcolor=#fefefe
| 174669 ||  || — || September 26, 2003 || Socorro || LINEAR || — || align=right | 1.1 km || 
|-id=670 bgcolor=#fefefe
| 174670 ||  || — || September 26, 2003 || Socorro || LINEAR || — || align=right | 1.5 km || 
|-id=671 bgcolor=#fefefe
| 174671 ||  || — || September 26, 2003 || Socorro || LINEAR || NYS || align=right | 1.3 km || 
|-id=672 bgcolor=#fefefe
| 174672 ||  || — || September 26, 2003 || Socorro || LINEAR || — || align=right | 1.7 km || 
|-id=673 bgcolor=#fefefe
| 174673 ||  || — || September 27, 2003 || Kitt Peak || Spacewatch || MAS || align=right | 1.0 km || 
|-id=674 bgcolor=#fefefe
| 174674 ||  || — || September 29, 2003 || Socorro || LINEAR || FLO || align=right | 1.1 km || 
|-id=675 bgcolor=#fefefe
| 174675 ||  || — || September 24, 2003 || Haleakala || NEAT || — || align=right | 2.6 km || 
|-id=676 bgcolor=#fefefe
| 174676 ||  || — || September 20, 2003 || Socorro || LINEAR || — || align=right | 1.2 km || 
|-id=677 bgcolor=#E9E9E9
| 174677 ||  || — || September 16, 2003 || Palomar || NEAT || — || align=right | 1.6 km || 
|-id=678 bgcolor=#fefefe
| 174678 ||  || — || September 17, 2003 || Palomar || NEAT || — || align=right | 1.3 km || 
|-id=679 bgcolor=#fefefe
| 174679 ||  || — || September 17, 2003 || Palomar || NEAT || V || align=right | 1.1 km || 
|-id=680 bgcolor=#E9E9E9
| 174680 ||  || — || September 17, 2003 || Palomar || NEAT || — || align=right | 3.0 km || 
|-id=681 bgcolor=#fefefe
| 174681 ||  || — || September 27, 2003 || Socorro || LINEAR || — || align=right | 1.3 km || 
|-id=682 bgcolor=#fefefe
| 174682 ||  || — || September 29, 2003 || Socorro || LINEAR || — || align=right data-sort-value="0.88" | 880 m || 
|-id=683 bgcolor=#fefefe
| 174683 ||  || — || October 1, 2003 || Anderson Mesa || LONEOS || — || align=right | 1.5 km || 
|-id=684 bgcolor=#fefefe
| 174684 ||  || — || October 5, 2003 || Haleakala || NEAT || — || align=right | 1.4 km || 
|-id=685 bgcolor=#fefefe
| 174685 ||  || — || October 14, 2003 || Palomar || NEAT || KLI || align=right | 3.0 km || 
|-id=686 bgcolor=#fefefe
| 174686 ||  || — || October 2, 2003 || Kitt Peak || Spacewatch || V || align=right data-sort-value="0.99" | 990 m || 
|-id=687 bgcolor=#fefefe
| 174687 ||  || — || October 20, 2003 || Nashville || R. Clingan || — || align=right | 1.2 km || 
|-id=688 bgcolor=#fefefe
| 174688 ||  || — || October 16, 2003 || Anderson Mesa || LONEOS || V || align=right | 1.0 km || 
|-id=689 bgcolor=#fefefe
| 174689 ||  || — || October 16, 2003 || Anderson Mesa || LONEOS || — || align=right | 1.5 km || 
|-id=690 bgcolor=#fefefe
| 174690 ||  || — || October 20, 2003 || Kitt Peak || Spacewatch || NYS || align=right | 1.2 km || 
|-id=691 bgcolor=#fefefe
| 174691 ||  || — || October 23, 2003 || Anderson Mesa || LONEOS || — || align=right | 1.2 km || 
|-id=692 bgcolor=#fefefe
| 174692 ||  || — || October 22, 2003 || Kitt Peak || Spacewatch || — || align=right data-sort-value="0.99" | 990 m || 
|-id=693 bgcolor=#fefefe
| 174693 ||  || — || October 22, 2003 || Goodricke-Pigott || R. A. Tucker || — || align=right | 1.2 km || 
|-id=694 bgcolor=#fefefe
| 174694 ||  || — || October 16, 2003 || Anderson Mesa || LONEOS || MAS || align=right | 1.3 km || 
|-id=695 bgcolor=#fefefe
| 174695 ||  || — || October 16, 2003 || Goodricke-Pigott || R. A. Tucker || V || align=right | 1.0 km || 
|-id=696 bgcolor=#fefefe
| 174696 ||  || — || October 18, 2003 || Palomar || NEAT || V || align=right | 1.1 km || 
|-id=697 bgcolor=#fefefe
| 174697 ||  || — || October 16, 2003 || Kitt Peak || Spacewatch || FLO || align=right | 1.00 km || 
|-id=698 bgcolor=#fefefe
| 174698 ||  || — || October 16, 2003 || Palomar || NEAT || FLO || align=right | 1.4 km || 
|-id=699 bgcolor=#E9E9E9
| 174699 ||  || — || October 16, 2003 || Anderson Mesa || LONEOS || — || align=right | 5.3 km || 
|-id=700 bgcolor=#fefefe
| 174700 ||  || — || October 16, 2003 || Anderson Mesa || LONEOS || — || align=right | 2.6 km || 
|}

174701–174800 

|-bgcolor=#fefefe
| 174701 ||  || — || October 17, 2003 || Kitt Peak || Spacewatch || FLO || align=right | 1.3 km || 
|-id=702 bgcolor=#fefefe
| 174702 ||  || — || October 18, 2003 || Kitt Peak || Spacewatch || — || align=right | 1.4 km || 
|-id=703 bgcolor=#fefefe
| 174703 ||  || — || October 20, 2003 || Kitt Peak || Spacewatch || — || align=right | 1.1 km || 
|-id=704 bgcolor=#fefefe
| 174704 ||  || — || October 19, 2003 || Kitt Peak || Spacewatch || — || align=right | 1.1 km || 
|-id=705 bgcolor=#fefefe
| 174705 ||  || — || October 19, 2003 || Palomar || NEAT || — || align=right | 1.3 km || 
|-id=706 bgcolor=#fefefe
| 174706 ||  || — || October 20, 2003 || Kitt Peak || Spacewatch || — || align=right | 1.2 km || 
|-id=707 bgcolor=#fefefe
| 174707 ||  || — || October 20, 2003 || Palomar || NEAT || — || align=right | 1.3 km || 
|-id=708 bgcolor=#E9E9E9
| 174708 ||  || — || October 17, 2003 || Anderson Mesa || LONEOS || — || align=right | 1.7 km || 
|-id=709 bgcolor=#fefefe
| 174709 ||  || — || October 20, 2003 || Socorro || LINEAR || — || align=right | 1.5 km || 
|-id=710 bgcolor=#fefefe
| 174710 ||  || — || October 20, 2003 || Socorro || LINEAR || — || align=right | 1.7 km || 
|-id=711 bgcolor=#fefefe
| 174711 ||  || — || October 21, 2003 || Socorro || LINEAR || NYS || align=right | 1.1 km || 
|-id=712 bgcolor=#fefefe
| 174712 ||  || — || October 18, 2003 || Palomar || NEAT || — || align=right | 1.3 km || 
|-id=713 bgcolor=#fefefe
| 174713 ||  || — || October 19, 2003 || Palomar || NEAT || — || align=right | 1.7 km || 
|-id=714 bgcolor=#fefefe
| 174714 ||  || — || October 21, 2003 || Socorro || LINEAR || — || align=right | 1.4 km || 
|-id=715 bgcolor=#fefefe
| 174715 ||  || — || October 18, 2003 || Anderson Mesa || LONEOS || — || align=right | 1.6 km || 
|-id=716 bgcolor=#fefefe
| 174716 ||  || — || October 18, 2003 || Anderson Mesa || LONEOS || V || align=right | 1.1 km || 
|-id=717 bgcolor=#fefefe
| 174717 ||  || — || October 18, 2003 || Anderson Mesa || LONEOS || V || align=right data-sort-value="0.97" | 970 m || 
|-id=718 bgcolor=#fefefe
| 174718 ||  || — || October 18, 2003 || Anderson Mesa || LONEOS || V || align=right | 1.1 km || 
|-id=719 bgcolor=#fefefe
| 174719 ||  || — || October 20, 2003 || Socorro || LINEAR || — || align=right | 1.1 km || 
|-id=720 bgcolor=#fefefe
| 174720 ||  || — || October 21, 2003 || Socorro || LINEAR || NYS || align=right data-sort-value="0.80" | 800 m || 
|-id=721 bgcolor=#fefefe
| 174721 ||  || — || October 21, 2003 || Socorro || LINEAR || NYS || align=right | 2.8 km || 
|-id=722 bgcolor=#fefefe
| 174722 ||  || — || October 20, 2003 || Kitt Peak || Spacewatch || NYS || align=right data-sort-value="0.93" | 930 m || 
|-id=723 bgcolor=#fefefe
| 174723 ||  || — || October 20, 2003 || Kitt Peak || Spacewatch || NYS || align=right | 1.0 km || 
|-id=724 bgcolor=#fefefe
| 174724 ||  || — || October 21, 2003 || Kitt Peak || Spacewatch || — || align=right | 2.0 km || 
|-id=725 bgcolor=#fefefe
| 174725 ||  || — || October 21, 2003 || Socorro || LINEAR || NYS || align=right | 2.9 km || 
|-id=726 bgcolor=#fefefe
| 174726 ||  || — || October 21, 2003 || Socorro || LINEAR || — || align=right | 1.1 km || 
|-id=727 bgcolor=#fefefe
| 174727 ||  || — || October 22, 2003 || Socorro || LINEAR || MAS || align=right | 1.1 km || 
|-id=728 bgcolor=#fefefe
| 174728 ||  || — || October 21, 2003 || Socorro || LINEAR || MAS || align=right | 1.1 km || 
|-id=729 bgcolor=#fefefe
| 174729 ||  || — || October 21, 2003 || Socorro || LINEAR || FLO || align=right | 1.0 km || 
|-id=730 bgcolor=#fefefe
| 174730 ||  || — || October 21, 2003 || Palomar || NEAT || — || align=right data-sort-value="0.94" | 940 m || 
|-id=731 bgcolor=#fefefe
| 174731 ||  || — || October 21, 2003 || Palomar || NEAT || — || align=right | 1.2 km || 
|-id=732 bgcolor=#fefefe
| 174732 ||  || — || October 22, 2003 || Socorro || LINEAR || — || align=right | 2.8 km || 
|-id=733 bgcolor=#fefefe
| 174733 ||  || — || October 22, 2003 || Socorro || LINEAR || V || align=right data-sort-value="0.99" | 990 m || 
|-id=734 bgcolor=#fefefe
| 174734 ||  || — || October 23, 2003 || Kvistaberg || UDAS || — || align=right | 1.8 km || 
|-id=735 bgcolor=#fefefe
| 174735 ||  || — || October 20, 2003 || Kitt Peak || Spacewatch || MAS || align=right | 1.1 km || 
|-id=736 bgcolor=#fefefe
| 174736 ||  || — || October 23, 2003 || Anderson Mesa || LONEOS || — || align=right | 1.6 km || 
|-id=737 bgcolor=#fefefe
| 174737 ||  || — || October 24, 2003 || Socorro || LINEAR || — || align=right | 1.2 km || 
|-id=738 bgcolor=#fefefe
| 174738 ||  || — || October 21, 2003 || Socorro || LINEAR || — || align=right | 3.1 km || 
|-id=739 bgcolor=#fefefe
| 174739 ||  || — || October 22, 2003 || Socorro || LINEAR || V || align=right data-sort-value="0.95" | 950 m || 
|-id=740 bgcolor=#E9E9E9
| 174740 ||  || — || October 23, 2003 || Anderson Mesa || LONEOS || MRX || align=right | 2.0 km || 
|-id=741 bgcolor=#fefefe
| 174741 ||  || — || October 23, 2003 || Kitt Peak || Spacewatch || — || align=right | 1.8 km || 
|-id=742 bgcolor=#fefefe
| 174742 ||  || — || October 24, 2003 || Socorro || LINEAR || — || align=right data-sort-value="0.99" | 990 m || 
|-id=743 bgcolor=#E9E9E9
| 174743 ||  || — || October 24, 2003 || Socorro || LINEAR || — || align=right | 1.7 km || 
|-id=744 bgcolor=#fefefe
| 174744 ||  || — || October 23, 2003 || Anderson Mesa || LONEOS || FLO || align=right | 1.1 km || 
|-id=745 bgcolor=#fefefe
| 174745 ||  || — || October 24, 2003 || Haleakala || NEAT || FLO || align=right | 1.1 km || 
|-id=746 bgcolor=#fefefe
| 174746 ||  || — || October 24, 2003 || Socorro || LINEAR || — || align=right | 1.5 km || 
|-id=747 bgcolor=#fefefe
| 174747 ||  || — || October 27, 2003 || Socorro || LINEAR || — || align=right | 1.5 km || 
|-id=748 bgcolor=#fefefe
| 174748 ||  || — || October 27, 2003 || Socorro || LINEAR || — || align=right | 1.6 km || 
|-id=749 bgcolor=#fefefe
| 174749 ||  || — || October 27, 2003 || Socorro || LINEAR || — || align=right | 1.4 km || 
|-id=750 bgcolor=#fefefe
| 174750 ||  || — || October 29, 2003 || Catalina || CSS || — || align=right | 1.1 km || 
|-id=751 bgcolor=#fefefe
| 174751 ||  || — || October 30, 2003 || Socorro || LINEAR || FLO || align=right | 1.3 km || 
|-id=752 bgcolor=#E9E9E9
| 174752 ||  || — || October 28, 2003 || Haleakala || NEAT || — || align=right | 2.3 km || 
|-id=753 bgcolor=#fefefe
| 174753 ||  || — || October 29, 2003 || Anderson Mesa || LONEOS || — || align=right | 1.5 km || 
|-id=754 bgcolor=#fefefe
| 174754 ||  || — || October 29, 2003 || Anderson Mesa || LONEOS || — || align=right | 1.4 km || 
|-id=755 bgcolor=#fefefe
| 174755 ||  || — || October 16, 2003 || Kitt Peak || Spacewatch || — || align=right | 1.2 km || 
|-id=756 bgcolor=#FA8072
| 174756 || 2003 VN || — || November 1, 2003 || Socorro || LINEAR || — || align=right | 1.5 km || 
|-id=757 bgcolor=#fefefe
| 174757 ||  || — || November 5, 2003 || Socorro || LINEAR || — || align=right | 1.4 km || 
|-id=758 bgcolor=#fefefe
| 174758 ||  || — || November 14, 2003 || Wrightwood || J. W. Young || — || align=right | 1.2 km || 
|-id=759 bgcolor=#fefefe
| 174759 ||  || — || November 15, 2003 || Kitt Peak || Spacewatch || V || align=right | 1.0 km || 
|-id=760 bgcolor=#fefefe
| 174760 ||  || — || November 15, 2003 || Palomar || NEAT || NYS || align=right | 1.2 km || 
|-id=761 bgcolor=#fefefe
| 174761 ||  || — || November 3, 2003 || Socorro || LINEAR || — || align=right | 4.3 km || 
|-id=762 bgcolor=#fefefe
| 174762 ||  || — || November 18, 2003 || Palomar || NEAT || — || align=right | 1.4 km || 
|-id=763 bgcolor=#fefefe
| 174763 ||  || — || November 18, 2003 || Kitt Peak || Spacewatch || V || align=right data-sort-value="0.98" | 980 m || 
|-id=764 bgcolor=#fefefe
| 174764 ||  || — || November 21, 2003 || Desert Moon || B. L. Stevens || V || align=right data-sort-value="0.89" | 890 m || 
|-id=765 bgcolor=#E9E9E9
| 174765 ||  || — || November 19, 2003 || Kingsnake || J. V. McClusky || — || align=right | 3.6 km || 
|-id=766 bgcolor=#fefefe
| 174766 ||  || — || November 16, 2003 || Kitt Peak || Spacewatch || — || align=right | 1.2 km || 
|-id=767 bgcolor=#fefefe
| 174767 ||  || — || November 16, 2003 || Kitt Peak || Spacewatch || NYS || align=right | 2.4 km || 
|-id=768 bgcolor=#fefefe
| 174768 ||  || — || November 19, 2003 || Kitt Peak || Spacewatch || — || align=right | 3.1 km || 
|-id=769 bgcolor=#fefefe
| 174769 ||  || — || November 18, 2003 || Palomar || NEAT || — || align=right | 1.3 km || 
|-id=770 bgcolor=#fefefe
| 174770 ||  || — || November 19, 2003 || Palomar || NEAT || — || align=right | 1.5 km || 
|-id=771 bgcolor=#fefefe
| 174771 ||  || — || November 19, 2003 || Palomar || NEAT || V || align=right | 1.3 km || 
|-id=772 bgcolor=#fefefe
| 174772 ||  || — || November 19, 2003 || Socorro || LINEAR || — || align=right | 1.2 km || 
|-id=773 bgcolor=#fefefe
| 174773 ||  || — || November 20, 2003 || Kitt Peak || Spacewatch || MAS || align=right data-sort-value="0.85" | 850 m || 
|-id=774 bgcolor=#fefefe
| 174774 ||  || — || November 20, 2003 || Socorro || LINEAR || — || align=right | 1.3 km || 
|-id=775 bgcolor=#fefefe
| 174775 ||  || — || November 20, 2003 || Socorro || LINEAR || — || align=right | 1.6 km || 
|-id=776 bgcolor=#fefefe
| 174776 ||  || — || November 19, 2003 || Kitt Peak || Spacewatch || V || align=right | 1.1 km || 
|-id=777 bgcolor=#fefefe
| 174777 ||  || — || November 19, 2003 || Kitt Peak || Spacewatch || — || align=right | 2.9 km || 
|-id=778 bgcolor=#E9E9E9
| 174778 ||  || — || November 20, 2003 || Socorro || LINEAR || — || align=right | 2.3 km || 
|-id=779 bgcolor=#E9E9E9
| 174779 ||  || — || November 20, 2003 || Socorro || LINEAR || — || align=right | 2.0 km || 
|-id=780 bgcolor=#E9E9E9
| 174780 ||  || — || November 18, 2003 || Palomar || NEAT || KON || align=right | 3.8 km || 
|-id=781 bgcolor=#fefefe
| 174781 ||  || — || November 19, 2003 || Anderson Mesa || LONEOS || FLO || align=right | 1.2 km || 
|-id=782 bgcolor=#fefefe
| 174782 ||  || — || November 19, 2003 || Anderson Mesa || LONEOS || MAS || align=right data-sort-value="0.97" | 970 m || 
|-id=783 bgcolor=#fefefe
| 174783 ||  || — || November 19, 2003 || Anderson Mesa || LONEOS || — || align=right | 1.3 km || 
|-id=784 bgcolor=#FA8072
| 174784 ||  || — || November 20, 2003 || Palomar || NEAT || — || align=right | 2.2 km || 
|-id=785 bgcolor=#E9E9E9
| 174785 ||  || — || November 21, 2003 || Palomar || NEAT || — || align=right | 2.7 km || 
|-id=786 bgcolor=#fefefe
| 174786 ||  || — || November 20, 2003 || Socorro || LINEAR || V || align=right | 1.2 km || 
|-id=787 bgcolor=#fefefe
| 174787 ||  || — || November 20, 2003 || Socorro || LINEAR || — || align=right | 1.8 km || 
|-id=788 bgcolor=#fefefe
| 174788 ||  || — || November 20, 2003 || Socorro || LINEAR || — || align=right | 1.1 km || 
|-id=789 bgcolor=#fefefe
| 174789 ||  || — || November 20, 2003 || Socorro || LINEAR || V || align=right | 1.3 km || 
|-id=790 bgcolor=#fefefe
| 174790 ||  || — || November 20, 2003 || Socorro || LINEAR || — || align=right | 1.6 km || 
|-id=791 bgcolor=#fefefe
| 174791 ||  || — || November 20, 2003 || Socorro || LINEAR || — || align=right | 1.4 km || 
|-id=792 bgcolor=#fefefe
| 174792 ||  || — || November 21, 2003 || Socorro || LINEAR || V || align=right data-sort-value="0.98" | 980 m || 
|-id=793 bgcolor=#fefefe
| 174793 ||  || — || November 21, 2003 || Socorro || LINEAR || — || align=right | 1.7 km || 
|-id=794 bgcolor=#d6d6d6
| 174794 ||  || — || November 21, 2003 || Socorro || LINEAR || — || align=right | 3.9 km || 
|-id=795 bgcolor=#fefefe
| 174795 ||  || — || November 21, 2003 || Socorro || LINEAR || FLO || align=right data-sort-value="0.98" | 980 m || 
|-id=796 bgcolor=#E9E9E9
| 174796 ||  || — || November 21, 2003 || Kitt Peak || Spacewatch || — || align=right | 1.2 km || 
|-id=797 bgcolor=#fefefe
| 174797 ||  || — || November 23, 2003 || Catalina || CSS || CHL || align=right | 3.6 km || 
|-id=798 bgcolor=#fefefe
| 174798 ||  || — || November 23, 2003 || Kitt Peak || Spacewatch || — || align=right | 1.3 km || 
|-id=799 bgcolor=#fefefe
| 174799 ||  || — || November 29, 2003 || Kitt Peak || Spacewatch || FLO || align=right | 1.1 km || 
|-id=800 bgcolor=#fefefe
| 174800 ||  || — || November 30, 2003 || Kitt Peak || Spacewatch || MAS || align=right data-sort-value="0.89" | 890 m || 
|}

174801–174900 

|-bgcolor=#fefefe
| 174801 Etscorn ||  ||  || November 23, 2003 || Etscorn || W. H. Ryan || — || align=right | 1.2 km || 
|-id=802 bgcolor=#fefefe
| 174802 ||  || — || November 19, 2003 || Palomar || NEAT || V || align=right | 1.2 km || 
|-id=803 bgcolor=#fefefe
| 174803 ||  || — || November 23, 2003 || Anderson Mesa || LONEOS || — || align=right | 1.3 km || 
|-id=804 bgcolor=#fefefe
| 174804 ||  || — || November 19, 2003 || Socorro || LINEAR || — || align=right | 1.4 km || 
|-id=805 bgcolor=#fefefe
| 174805 ||  || — || November 21, 2003 || Palomar || NEAT || — || align=right | 3.1 km || 
|-id=806 bgcolor=#FFC2E0
| 174806 || 2003 XL || — || December 3, 2003 || Anderson Mesa || LONEOS || AMO +1km || align=right | 1.3 km || 
|-id=807 bgcolor=#fefefe
| 174807 ||  || — || December 1, 2003 || Socorro || LINEAR || NYS || align=right | 2.6 km || 
|-id=808 bgcolor=#fefefe
| 174808 ||  || — || December 1, 2003 || Socorro || LINEAR || — || align=right | 1.6 km || 
|-id=809 bgcolor=#E9E9E9
| 174809 ||  || — || December 4, 2003 || Socorro || LINEAR || — || align=right | 2.3 km || 
|-id=810 bgcolor=#E9E9E9
| 174810 ||  || — || December 4, 2003 || Socorro || LINEAR || — || align=right | 4.7 km || 
|-id=811 bgcolor=#fefefe
| 174811 ||  || — || December 14, 2003 || Palomar || NEAT || — || align=right | 2.7 km || 
|-id=812 bgcolor=#E9E9E9
| 174812 ||  || — || December 14, 2003 || Palomar || NEAT || — || align=right | 2.1 km || 
|-id=813 bgcolor=#fefefe
| 174813 ||  || — || December 14, 2003 || Kitt Peak || Spacewatch || — || align=right | 1.1 km || 
|-id=814 bgcolor=#fefefe
| 174814 ||  || — || December 14, 2003 || Kitt Peak || Spacewatch || FLO || align=right | 1.2 km || 
|-id=815 bgcolor=#E9E9E9
| 174815 ||  || — || December 19, 2003 || Kingsnake || J. V. McClusky || MAR || align=right | 2.2 km || 
|-id=816 bgcolor=#fefefe
| 174816 ||  || — || December 17, 2003 || Anderson Mesa || LONEOS || — || align=right | 1.6 km || 
|-id=817 bgcolor=#d6d6d6
| 174817 ||  || — || December 17, 2003 || Anderson Mesa || LONEOS || ALA || align=right | 7.6 km || 
|-id=818 bgcolor=#fefefe
| 174818 ||  || — || December 17, 2003 || Palomar || NEAT || — || align=right | 1.5 km || 
|-id=819 bgcolor=#fefefe
| 174819 ||  || — || December 17, 2003 || Kitt Peak || Spacewatch || — || align=right | 1.7 km || 
|-id=820 bgcolor=#fefefe
| 174820 ||  || — || December 17, 2003 || Kitt Peak || Spacewatch || MAS || align=right | 1.0 km || 
|-id=821 bgcolor=#fefefe
| 174821 ||  || — || December 17, 2003 || Kitt Peak || Spacewatch || MAS || align=right | 1.3 km || 
|-id=822 bgcolor=#fefefe
| 174822 ||  || — || December 17, 2003 || Kitt Peak || Spacewatch || MAS || align=right data-sort-value="0.95" | 950 m || 
|-id=823 bgcolor=#d6d6d6
| 174823 ||  || — || December 17, 2003 || Kitt Peak || Spacewatch || — || align=right | 4.7 km || 
|-id=824 bgcolor=#fefefe
| 174824 ||  || — || December 19, 2003 || Socorro || LINEAR || — || align=right | 1.2 km || 
|-id=825 bgcolor=#E9E9E9
| 174825 ||  || — || December 17, 2003 || Kitt Peak || Spacewatch || — || align=right | 1.8 km || 
|-id=826 bgcolor=#E9E9E9
| 174826 ||  || — || December 19, 2003 || Socorro || LINEAR || — || align=right | 1.7 km || 
|-id=827 bgcolor=#fefefe
| 174827 ||  || — || December 17, 2003 || Kitt Peak || Spacewatch || V || align=right | 1.1 km || 
|-id=828 bgcolor=#fefefe
| 174828 ||  || — || December 19, 2003 || Socorro || LINEAR || — || align=right | 1.8 km || 
|-id=829 bgcolor=#E9E9E9
| 174829 ||  || — || December 20, 2003 || Socorro || LINEAR || — || align=right | 3.0 km || 
|-id=830 bgcolor=#fefefe
| 174830 ||  || — || December 18, 2003 || Socorro || LINEAR || V || align=right | 1.6 km || 
|-id=831 bgcolor=#fefefe
| 174831 ||  || — || December 18, 2003 || Socorro || LINEAR || — || align=right | 1.2 km || 
|-id=832 bgcolor=#E9E9E9
| 174832 ||  || — || December 18, 2003 || Kitt Peak || Spacewatch || — || align=right | 2.6 km || 
|-id=833 bgcolor=#fefefe
| 174833 ||  || — || December 19, 2003 || Socorro || LINEAR || MAS || align=right | 1.2 km || 
|-id=834 bgcolor=#E9E9E9
| 174834 ||  || — || December 19, 2003 || Socorro || LINEAR || — || align=right | 2.2 km || 
|-id=835 bgcolor=#E9E9E9
| 174835 ||  || — || December 21, 2003 || Socorro || LINEAR || — || align=right | 3.2 km || 
|-id=836 bgcolor=#E9E9E9
| 174836 ||  || — || December 22, 2003 || Socorro || LINEAR || — || align=right | 1.8 km || 
|-id=837 bgcolor=#fefefe
| 174837 ||  || — || December 23, 2003 || Socorro || LINEAR || V || align=right | 1.3 km || 
|-id=838 bgcolor=#fefefe
| 174838 ||  || — || December 27, 2003 || Kitt Peak || Spacewatch || V || align=right | 1.0 km || 
|-id=839 bgcolor=#fefefe
| 174839 ||  || — || December 27, 2003 || Socorro || LINEAR || — || align=right | 1.6 km || 
|-id=840 bgcolor=#E9E9E9
| 174840 ||  || — || December 27, 2003 || Socorro || LINEAR || — || align=right | 3.4 km || 
|-id=841 bgcolor=#E9E9E9
| 174841 ||  || — || December 28, 2003 || Socorro || LINEAR || DOR || align=right | 5.6 km || 
|-id=842 bgcolor=#E9E9E9
| 174842 ||  || — || December 28, 2003 || Socorro || LINEAR || RAF || align=right | 1.7 km || 
|-id=843 bgcolor=#E9E9E9
| 174843 ||  || — || December 28, 2003 || Socorro || LINEAR || — || align=right | 3.7 km || 
|-id=844 bgcolor=#E9E9E9
| 174844 ||  || — || December 29, 2003 || Socorro || LINEAR || — || align=right | 2.4 km || 
|-id=845 bgcolor=#E9E9E9
| 174845 ||  || — || December 29, 2003 || Catalina || CSS || — || align=right | 4.9 km || 
|-id=846 bgcolor=#E9E9E9
| 174846 ||  || — || December 29, 2003 || Socorro || LINEAR || — || align=right | 2.6 km || 
|-id=847 bgcolor=#E9E9E9
| 174847 ||  || — || December 29, 2003 || Socorro || LINEAR || EUN || align=right | 2.7 km || 
|-id=848 bgcolor=#E9E9E9
| 174848 ||  || — || December 30, 2003 || Socorro || LINEAR || — || align=right | 1.8 km || 
|-id=849 bgcolor=#fefefe
| 174849 ||  || — || December 21, 2003 || Socorro || LINEAR || NYS || align=right | 1.2 km || 
|-id=850 bgcolor=#E9E9E9
| 174850 ||  || — || December 26, 2003 || Haleakala || NEAT || ADE || align=right | 4.4 km || 
|-id=851 bgcolor=#fefefe
| 174851 ||  || — || December 17, 2003 || Kitt Peak || Spacewatch || NYS || align=right | 1.0 km || 
|-id=852 bgcolor=#E9E9E9
| 174852 ||  || — || December 17, 2003 || Kitt Peak || Spacewatch || AGN || align=right | 1.8 km || 
|-id=853 bgcolor=#E9E9E9
| 174853 ||  || — || December 18, 2003 || Socorro || LINEAR || — || align=right | 4.3 km || 
|-id=854 bgcolor=#fefefe
| 174854 ||  || — || December 19, 2003 || Kitt Peak || Spacewatch || V || align=right | 1.0 km || 
|-id=855 bgcolor=#fefefe
| 174855 ||  || — || December 30, 2003 || Socorro || LINEAR || — || align=right | 1.8 km || 
|-id=856 bgcolor=#E9E9E9
| 174856 ||  || — || January 13, 2004 || Anderson Mesa || LONEOS || — || align=right | 2.1 km || 
|-id=857 bgcolor=#fefefe
| 174857 ||  || — || January 13, 2004 || Anderson Mesa || LONEOS || NYS || align=right | 1.3 km || 
|-id=858 bgcolor=#E9E9E9
| 174858 ||  || — || January 12, 2004 || Palomar || NEAT || — || align=right | 1.7 km || 
|-id=859 bgcolor=#E9E9E9
| 174859 ||  || — || January 13, 2004 || Anderson Mesa || LONEOS || — || align=right | 1.4 km || 
|-id=860 bgcolor=#E9E9E9
| 174860 ||  || — || January 14, 2004 || Palomar || NEAT || — || align=right | 4.6 km || 
|-id=861 bgcolor=#E9E9E9
| 174861 ||  || — || January 15, 2004 || Kitt Peak || Spacewatch || — || align=right | 2.7 km || 
|-id=862 bgcolor=#E9E9E9
| 174862 ||  || — || January 16, 2004 || Palomar || NEAT || — || align=right | 1.7 km || 
|-id=863 bgcolor=#fefefe
| 174863 ||  || — || January 16, 2004 || Palomar || NEAT || MAS || align=right | 1.1 km || 
|-id=864 bgcolor=#fefefe
| 174864 ||  || — || January 17, 2004 || Palomar || NEAT || NYS || align=right data-sort-value="0.98" | 980 m || 
|-id=865 bgcolor=#fefefe
| 174865 ||  || — || January 16, 2004 || Anderson Mesa || LONEOS || — || align=right | 1.5 km || 
|-id=866 bgcolor=#E9E9E9
| 174866 ||  || — || January 18, 2004 || Palomar || NEAT || — || align=right | 2.8 km || 
|-id=867 bgcolor=#fefefe
| 174867 ||  || — || January 16, 2004 || Kitt Peak || Spacewatch || NYS || align=right | 1.0 km || 
|-id=868 bgcolor=#E9E9E9
| 174868 ||  || — || January 19, 2004 || Catalina || CSS || — || align=right | 4.1 km || 
|-id=869 bgcolor=#E9E9E9
| 174869 ||  || — || January 20, 2004 || Socorro || LINEAR || — || align=right | 3.0 km || 
|-id=870 bgcolor=#fefefe
| 174870 ||  || — || January 21, 2004 || Socorro || LINEAR || NYS || align=right | 1.0 km || 
|-id=871 bgcolor=#E9E9E9
| 174871 ||  || — || January 19, 2004 || Catalina || CSS || RAF || align=right | 1.5 km || 
|-id=872 bgcolor=#E9E9E9
| 174872 ||  || — || January 19, 2004 || Socorro || LINEAR || — || align=right | 2.3 km || 
|-id=873 bgcolor=#fefefe
| 174873 ||  || — || January 22, 2004 || Socorro || LINEAR || — || align=right | 1.4 km || 
|-id=874 bgcolor=#d6d6d6
| 174874 ||  || — || January 21, 2004 || Socorro || LINEAR || EMA || align=right | 5.9 km || 
|-id=875 bgcolor=#fefefe
| 174875 ||  || — || January 21, 2004 || Socorro || LINEAR || — || align=right | 1.7 km || 
|-id=876 bgcolor=#fefefe
| 174876 ||  || — || January 21, 2004 || Socorro || LINEAR || — || align=right | 1.3 km || 
|-id=877 bgcolor=#fefefe
| 174877 ||  || — || January 21, 2004 || Socorro || LINEAR || NYS || align=right | 1.2 km || 
|-id=878 bgcolor=#E9E9E9
| 174878 ||  || — || January 22, 2004 || Socorro || LINEAR || — || align=right | 2.0 km || 
|-id=879 bgcolor=#E9E9E9
| 174879 ||  || — || January 22, 2004 || Socorro || LINEAR || — || align=right | 2.9 km || 
|-id=880 bgcolor=#fefefe
| 174880 ||  || — || January 22, 2004 || Socorro || LINEAR || NYS || align=right | 1.1 km || 
|-id=881 bgcolor=#FFC2E0
| 174881 ||  || — || January 23, 2004 || Socorro || LINEAR || APO +1km || align=right data-sort-value="0.89" | 890 m || 
|-id=882 bgcolor=#E9E9E9
| 174882 ||  || — || January 22, 2004 || Socorro || LINEAR || WIT || align=right | 1.5 km || 
|-id=883 bgcolor=#E9E9E9
| 174883 ||  || — || January 23, 2004 || Socorro || LINEAR || — || align=right | 2.2 km || 
|-id=884 bgcolor=#E9E9E9
| 174884 ||  || — || January 24, 2004 || Socorro || LINEAR || — || align=right | 2.4 km || 
|-id=885 bgcolor=#fefefe
| 174885 ||  || — || January 24, 2004 || Socorro || LINEAR || — || align=right | 1.4 km || 
|-id=886 bgcolor=#E9E9E9
| 174886 ||  || — || January 23, 2004 || Socorro || LINEAR || — || align=right | 4.1 km || 
|-id=887 bgcolor=#E9E9E9
| 174887 ||  || — || January 25, 2004 || Haleakala || NEAT || MIT || align=right | 3.6 km || 
|-id=888 bgcolor=#E9E9E9
| 174888 ||  || — || January 23, 2004 || Socorro || LINEAR || — || align=right | 5.0 km || 
|-id=889 bgcolor=#E9E9E9
| 174889 ||  || — || January 23, 2004 || Socorro || LINEAR || — || align=right | 3.0 km || 
|-id=890 bgcolor=#E9E9E9
| 174890 ||  || — || January 24, 2004 || Socorro || LINEAR || — || align=right | 3.1 km || 
|-id=891 bgcolor=#d6d6d6
| 174891 ||  || — || January 26, 2004 || Anderson Mesa || LONEOS || — || align=right | 3.2 km || 
|-id=892 bgcolor=#E9E9E9
| 174892 ||  || — || January 24, 2004 || Socorro || LINEAR || — || align=right | 1.3 km || 
|-id=893 bgcolor=#E9E9E9
| 174893 ||  || — || January 29, 2004 || Socorro || LINEAR || — || align=right | 2.6 km || 
|-id=894 bgcolor=#E9E9E9
| 174894 ||  || — || January 29, 2004 || Kitt Peak || Spacewatch || — || align=right | 4.3 km || 
|-id=895 bgcolor=#E9E9E9
| 174895 ||  || — || January 23, 2004 || Socorro || LINEAR || — || align=right | 1.9 km || 
|-id=896 bgcolor=#E9E9E9
| 174896 ||  || — || January 26, 2004 || Anderson Mesa || LONEOS || EUN || align=right | 1.6 km || 
|-id=897 bgcolor=#E9E9E9
| 174897 ||  || — || January 28, 2004 || Catalina || CSS || — || align=right | 1.8 km || 
|-id=898 bgcolor=#E9E9E9
| 174898 ||  || — || January 29, 2004 || Catalina || CSS || — || align=right | 5.8 km || 
|-id=899 bgcolor=#E9E9E9
| 174899 ||  || — || January 28, 2004 || Kitt Peak || Spacewatch || MAR || align=right | 1.8 km || 
|-id=900 bgcolor=#E9E9E9
| 174900 ||  || — || January 28, 2004 || Catalina || CSS || — || align=right | 2.0 km || 
|}

174901–175000 

|-bgcolor=#E9E9E9
| 174901 ||  || — || January 29, 2004 || Socorro || LINEAR || — || align=right | 1.8 km || 
|-id=902 bgcolor=#E9E9E9
| 174902 ||  || — || January 29, 2004 || Catalina || CSS || — || align=right | 2.0 km || 
|-id=903 bgcolor=#E9E9E9
| 174903 ||  || — || January 30, 2004 || Kitt Peak || Spacewatch || MIS || align=right | 3.6 km || 
|-id=904 bgcolor=#E9E9E9
| 174904 ||  || — || January 18, 2004 || Kitt Peak || Spacewatch || — || align=right | 1.3 km || 
|-id=905 bgcolor=#E9E9E9
| 174905 ||  || — || January 16, 2004 || Kitt Peak || Spacewatch || — || align=right | 1.3 km || 
|-id=906 bgcolor=#E9E9E9
| 174906 ||  || — || January 16, 2004 || Kitt Peak || Spacewatch || — || align=right | 1.3 km || 
|-id=907 bgcolor=#fefefe
| 174907 ||  || — || January 18, 2004 || Kitt Peak || Spacewatch || SUL || align=right | 3.5 km || 
|-id=908 bgcolor=#E9E9E9
| 174908 ||  || — || January 18, 2004 || Palomar || NEAT || — || align=right | 3.6 km || 
|-id=909 bgcolor=#E9E9E9
| 174909 ||  || — || January 22, 2004 || Socorro || LINEAR || — || align=right | 2.9 km || 
|-id=910 bgcolor=#E9E9E9
| 174910 ||  || — || January 18, 2004 || Palomar || NEAT || — || align=right | 2.1 km || 
|-id=911 bgcolor=#E9E9E9
| 174911 ||  || — || January 27, 2004 || Kitt Peak || Spacewatch || — || align=right | 1.8 km || 
|-id=912 bgcolor=#E9E9E9
| 174912 ||  || — || January 28, 2004 || Kitt Peak || Spacewatch || — || align=right | 1.3 km || 
|-id=913 bgcolor=#E9E9E9
| 174913 ||  || — || January 28, 2004 || Kitt Peak || Spacewatch || ADE || align=right | 2.2 km || 
|-id=914 bgcolor=#d6d6d6
| 174914 ||  || — || February 11, 2004 || Desert Eagle || W. K. Y. Yeung || — || align=right | 5.6 km || 
|-id=915 bgcolor=#E9E9E9
| 174915 ||  || — || February 11, 2004 || Desert Eagle || W. K. Y. Yeung || — || align=right | 2.2 km || 
|-id=916 bgcolor=#E9E9E9
| 174916 ||  || — || February 10, 2004 || Palomar || NEAT || — || align=right | 2.4 km || 
|-id=917 bgcolor=#E9E9E9
| 174917 ||  || — || February 10, 2004 || Palomar || NEAT || — || align=right | 2.6 km || 
|-id=918 bgcolor=#E9E9E9
| 174918 ||  || — || February 11, 2004 || Palomar || NEAT || — || align=right | 1.5 km || 
|-id=919 bgcolor=#E9E9E9
| 174919 ||  || — || February 11, 2004 || Kitt Peak || Spacewatch || — || align=right | 1.1 km || 
|-id=920 bgcolor=#E9E9E9
| 174920 ||  || — || February 11, 2004 || Palomar || NEAT || — || align=right | 2.1 km || 
|-id=921 bgcolor=#E9E9E9
| 174921 ||  || — || February 11, 2004 || Palomar || NEAT || — || align=right | 1.6 km || 
|-id=922 bgcolor=#E9E9E9
| 174922 ||  || — || February 12, 2004 || Kitt Peak || Spacewatch || — || align=right | 1.3 km || 
|-id=923 bgcolor=#E9E9E9
| 174923 ||  || — || February 12, 2004 || Kitt Peak || Spacewatch || — || align=right | 1.2 km || 
|-id=924 bgcolor=#E9E9E9
| 174924 ||  || — || February 12, 2004 || Kitt Peak || Spacewatch || — || align=right | 2.0 km || 
|-id=925 bgcolor=#E9E9E9
| 174925 ||  || — || February 11, 2004 || Palomar || NEAT || — || align=right | 2.9 km || 
|-id=926 bgcolor=#E9E9E9
| 174926 ||  || — || February 12, 2004 || Kitt Peak || Spacewatch || — || align=right | 3.3 km || 
|-id=927 bgcolor=#E9E9E9
| 174927 ||  || — || February 13, 2004 || Palomar || NEAT || RAF || align=right | 1.3 km || 
|-id=928 bgcolor=#E9E9E9
| 174928 ||  || — || February 13, 2004 || Kitt Peak || Spacewatch || — || align=right | 3.3 km || 
|-id=929 bgcolor=#E9E9E9
| 174929 ||  || — || February 14, 2004 || Kitt Peak || Spacewatch || — || align=right | 2.5 km || 
|-id=930 bgcolor=#d6d6d6
| 174930 ||  || — || February 11, 2004 || Anderson Mesa || LONEOS || — || align=right | 4.7 km || 
|-id=931 bgcolor=#E9E9E9
| 174931 ||  || — || February 11, 2004 || Palomar || NEAT || — || align=right | 1.4 km || 
|-id=932 bgcolor=#E9E9E9
| 174932 ||  || — || February 10, 2004 || Palomar || NEAT || — || align=right | 1.3 km || 
|-id=933 bgcolor=#E9E9E9
| 174933 ||  || — || February 11, 2004 || Kitt Peak || Spacewatch || — || align=right | 3.6 km || 
|-id=934 bgcolor=#E9E9E9
| 174934 ||  || — || February 11, 2004 || Palomar || NEAT || MAR || align=right | 2.0 km || 
|-id=935 bgcolor=#d6d6d6
| 174935 ||  || — || February 11, 2004 || Palomar || NEAT || TRP || align=right | 5.3 km || 
|-id=936 bgcolor=#E9E9E9
| 174936 ||  || — || February 11, 2004 || Palomar || NEAT || — || align=right | 4.2 km || 
|-id=937 bgcolor=#E9E9E9
| 174937 ||  || — || February 13, 2004 || Kitt Peak || Spacewatch || — || align=right | 1.5 km || 
|-id=938 bgcolor=#E9E9E9
| 174938 ||  || — || February 14, 2004 || Haleakala || NEAT || — || align=right | 3.9 km || 
|-id=939 bgcolor=#E9E9E9
| 174939 ||  || — || February 11, 2004 || Anderson Mesa || LONEOS || — || align=right | 3.2 km || 
|-id=940 bgcolor=#d6d6d6
| 174940 ||  || — || February 11, 2004 || Palomar || NEAT || — || align=right | 3.5 km || 
|-id=941 bgcolor=#E9E9E9
| 174941 ||  || — || February 12, 2004 || Kitt Peak || Spacewatch || — || align=right | 1.9 km || 
|-id=942 bgcolor=#E9E9E9
| 174942 ||  || — || February 11, 2004 || Palomar || NEAT || — || align=right | 1.4 km || 
|-id=943 bgcolor=#E9E9E9
| 174943 ||  || — || February 11, 2004 || Palomar || NEAT || — || align=right | 2.3 km || 
|-id=944 bgcolor=#E9E9E9
| 174944 ||  || — || February 11, 2004 || Palomar || NEAT || AGN || align=right | 2.2 km || 
|-id=945 bgcolor=#E9E9E9
| 174945 ||  || — || February 12, 2004 || Kitt Peak || Spacewatch || — || align=right | 3.8 km || 
|-id=946 bgcolor=#d6d6d6
| 174946 ||  || — || February 14, 2004 || Haleakala || NEAT || — || align=right | 5.8 km || 
|-id=947 bgcolor=#E9E9E9
| 174947 ||  || — || February 14, 2004 || Kitt Peak || Spacewatch || — || align=right | 3.3 km || 
|-id=948 bgcolor=#E9E9E9
| 174948 ||  || — || February 12, 2004 || Kitt Peak || Spacewatch || — || align=right | 2.2 km || 
|-id=949 bgcolor=#E9E9E9
| 174949 ||  || — || February 14, 2004 || Catalina || CSS || — || align=right | 4.2 km || 
|-id=950 bgcolor=#E9E9E9
| 174950 ||  || — || February 13, 2004 || Palomar || NEAT || — || align=right | 2.9 km || 
|-id=951 bgcolor=#E9E9E9
| 174951 ||  || — || February 14, 2004 || Catalina || CSS || — || align=right | 2.3 km || 
|-id=952 bgcolor=#E9E9E9
| 174952 ||  || — || February 11, 2004 || Socorro || LINEAR || EUN || align=right | 2.2 km || 
|-id=953 bgcolor=#E9E9E9
| 174953 ||  || — || February 11, 2004 || Socorro || LINEAR || MAR || align=right | 1.8 km || 
|-id=954 bgcolor=#E9E9E9
| 174954 ||  || — || February 13, 2004 || Anderson Mesa || LONEOS || — || align=right | 1.5 km || 
|-id=955 bgcolor=#E9E9E9
| 174955 ||  || — || February 11, 2004 || Kitt Peak || Spacewatch || — || align=right | 2.2 km || 
|-id=956 bgcolor=#E9E9E9
| 174956 ||  || — || February 12, 2004 || Kitt Peak || Spacewatch || — || align=right | 2.1 km || 
|-id=957 bgcolor=#E9E9E9
| 174957 ||  || — || February 14, 2004 || Kitt Peak || Spacewatch || HEN || align=right | 1.5 km || 
|-id=958 bgcolor=#E9E9E9
| 174958 ||  || — || February 12, 2004 || Palomar || NEAT || — || align=right | 2.0 km || 
|-id=959 bgcolor=#E9E9E9
| 174959 ||  || — || February 17, 2004 || Socorro || LINEAR || — || align=right | 3.2 km || 
|-id=960 bgcolor=#E9E9E9
| 174960 ||  || — || February 16, 2004 || Kitt Peak || Spacewatch || — || align=right | 2.2 km || 
|-id=961 bgcolor=#d6d6d6
| 174961 ||  || — || February 16, 2004 || Socorro || LINEAR || — || align=right | 5.3 km || 
|-id=962 bgcolor=#E9E9E9
| 174962 ||  || — || February 16, 2004 || Kitt Peak || Spacewatch || AGN || align=right | 1.9 km || 
|-id=963 bgcolor=#E9E9E9
| 174963 ||  || — || February 17, 2004 || Kitt Peak || Spacewatch || — || align=right | 2.2 km || 
|-id=964 bgcolor=#E9E9E9
| 174964 ||  || — || February 16, 2004 || Catalina || CSS || — || align=right | 4.9 km || 
|-id=965 bgcolor=#d6d6d6
| 174965 ||  || — || February 17, 2004 || Kitt Peak || Spacewatch || — || align=right | 4.5 km || 
|-id=966 bgcolor=#E9E9E9
| 174966 ||  || — || February 18, 2004 || Kitt Peak || Spacewatch || — || align=right | 2.8 km || 
|-id=967 bgcolor=#E9E9E9
| 174967 ||  || — || February 16, 2004 || Socorro || LINEAR || — || align=right | 1.8 km || 
|-id=968 bgcolor=#E9E9E9
| 174968 ||  || — || February 17, 2004 || Kitt Peak || Spacewatch || — || align=right | 2.0 km || 
|-id=969 bgcolor=#E9E9E9
| 174969 ||  || — || February 17, 2004 || Socorro || LINEAR || — || align=right | 1.4 km || 
|-id=970 bgcolor=#E9E9E9
| 174970 ||  || — || February 17, 2004 || Socorro || LINEAR || — || align=right | 1.6 km || 
|-id=971 bgcolor=#E9E9E9
| 174971 ||  || — || February 18, 2004 || Kitt Peak || Spacewatch || — || align=right | 3.5 km || 
|-id=972 bgcolor=#E9E9E9
| 174972 ||  || — || February 18, 2004 || Catalina || CSS || MIS || align=right | 4.1 km || 
|-id=973 bgcolor=#E9E9E9
| 174973 ||  || — || February 20, 2004 || Haleakala || NEAT || — || align=right | 1.9 km || 
|-id=974 bgcolor=#E9E9E9
| 174974 ||  || — || February 23, 2004 || Socorro || LINEAR || HEN || align=right | 1.6 km || 
|-id=975 bgcolor=#E9E9E9
| 174975 ||  || — || February 17, 2004 || Kitt Peak || Spacewatch || AGN || align=right | 1.6 km || 
|-id=976 bgcolor=#fefefe
| 174976 ||  || — || February 19, 2004 || Socorro || LINEAR || — || align=right | 1.8 km || 
|-id=977 bgcolor=#E9E9E9
| 174977 ||  || — || February 20, 2004 || Haleakala || NEAT || — || align=right | 3.0 km || 
|-id=978 bgcolor=#E9E9E9
| 174978 ||  || — || February 23, 2004 || Socorro || LINEAR || — || align=right | 1.2 km || 
|-id=979 bgcolor=#E9E9E9
| 174979 ||  || — || February 25, 2004 || Socorro || LINEAR || — || align=right | 1.9 km || 
|-id=980 bgcolor=#E9E9E9
| 174980 ||  || — || February 23, 2004 || Socorro || LINEAR || — || align=right | 1.5 km || 
|-id=981 bgcolor=#fefefe
| 174981 ||  || — || February 26, 2004 || Socorro || LINEAR || NYS || align=right | 1.2 km || 
|-id=982 bgcolor=#E9E9E9
| 174982 ||  || — || February 17, 2004 || Kitt Peak || Spacewatch || HEN || align=right | 1.4 km || 
|-id=983 bgcolor=#E9E9E9
| 174983 ||  || — || March 12, 2004 || Palomar || NEAT || — || align=right | 2.4 km || 
|-id=984 bgcolor=#E9E9E9
| 174984 ||  || — || March 11, 2004 || Palomar || NEAT || — || align=right | 2.9 km || 
|-id=985 bgcolor=#E9E9E9
| 174985 ||  || — || March 11, 2004 || Palomar || NEAT || — || align=right | 3.8 km || 
|-id=986 bgcolor=#d6d6d6
| 174986 ||  || — || March 12, 2004 || Palomar || NEAT || — || align=right | 3.7 km || 
|-id=987 bgcolor=#E9E9E9
| 174987 ||  || — || March 13, 2004 || Palomar || NEAT || — || align=right | 4.1 km || 
|-id=988 bgcolor=#E9E9E9
| 174988 ||  || — || March 11, 2004 || Palomar || NEAT || — || align=right | 2.4 km || 
|-id=989 bgcolor=#E9E9E9
| 174989 ||  || — || March 12, 2004 || Palomar || NEAT || CLO || align=right | 3.3 km || 
|-id=990 bgcolor=#E9E9E9
| 174990 ||  || — || March 14, 2004 || Kitt Peak || Spacewatch || — || align=right | 4.1 km || 
|-id=991 bgcolor=#E9E9E9
| 174991 ||  || — || March 15, 2004 || Kitt Peak || Spacewatch || — || align=right | 1.7 km || 
|-id=992 bgcolor=#E9E9E9
| 174992 ||  || — || March 11, 2004 || Palomar || NEAT || WIT || align=right | 1.8 km || 
|-id=993 bgcolor=#E9E9E9
| 174993 ||  || — || March 12, 2004 || Palomar || NEAT || — || align=right | 2.1 km || 
|-id=994 bgcolor=#E9E9E9
| 174994 ||  || — || March 13, 2004 || Palomar || NEAT || — || align=right | 2.3 km || 
|-id=995 bgcolor=#E9E9E9
| 174995 ||  || — || March 15, 2004 || Kitt Peak || Spacewatch || — || align=right | 2.2 km || 
|-id=996 bgcolor=#E9E9E9
| 174996 ||  || — || March 15, 2004 || Catalina || CSS || HEN || align=right | 1.7 km || 
|-id=997 bgcolor=#E9E9E9
| 174997 ||  || — || March 15, 2004 || Catalina || CSS || — || align=right | 2.2 km || 
|-id=998 bgcolor=#E9E9E9
| 174998 ||  || — || March 12, 2004 || Palomar || NEAT || AGN || align=right | 1.7 km || 
|-id=999 bgcolor=#d6d6d6
| 174999 ||  || — || March 13, 2004 || Palomar || NEAT || — || align=right | 3.7 km || 
|-id=000 bgcolor=#E9E9E9
| 175000 ||  || — || March 14, 2004 || Socorro || LINEAR || GEF || align=right | 2.7 km || 
|}

References

External links 
 Discovery Circumstances: Numbered Minor Planets (170001)–(175000) (IAU Minor Planet Center)

0174